= Gurmantche language =

Gur language spoken in West Africa

Gourmanchéma
- Gulimancema
- Migulimancema
- Native to: Burkina Faso, Togo, Benin, Niger, Ghana, Nigeria
- Ethnicity: Gurma people
- Native speakers: 1.5 million (2012–2021)
- Language family: Niger–Congo?: Atlantic–Congo; Gur; Northern; Oti–Volta; Gurma; Gourmanchéma
- Writing system: Latin

Language codes
- ISO 639-3: gux
- Glottolog: gour1243
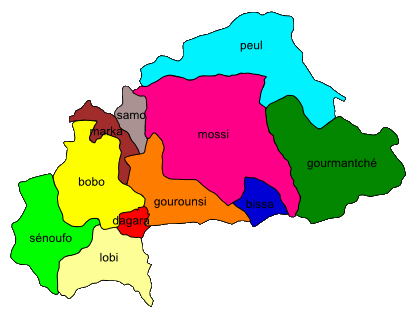

- People: Bigulimanceba
- Language: Migulimancema

Gourmanché (Goulmacema, Gourma, Gourmantche, Gulimancema, Gulmancema, Gurma, Gourmanchéma) is the language of the Gurma people. It is the largest by number of speakers of the Gurma subgroup of the Oti–Volta languages, which includes among others the Moba language and the Konkomba language. It is the major language of the easternmost parts of Burkina Faso, around the traditional Gurma capital Fada N'gourma; it is also spoken in neighbouring parts of northern Togo, Benin, Niger, Ghana and Nigeria.

== Phonology ==
=== Consonants ===
		Labial	Alveolar	Palatal	Velar	Labio- velar	Glottal
Nasal		m	n	ɲ	ŋ	ŋ͡m	
Plosive	voiceless	p	t	c	k	k͡p	
Plosive	voiced	b	d	ɟ	ɡ	ɡ͡b	
Fricative		f	s				(h)
Lateral			l				
Approximant				j		w	

- /h/ only occurs marginally.

=== Vowels ===
	Front	Central	Back
Close	i		u
Near-close	ɪ		ʊ
Close-mid	e	ə	o
Open-mid	ɛ	ə	ɔ
Open		a	

== Writing system ==
Gourmanché alphabet
a	b	c	d	e	f	g	gb	h	i	j	k	kp
l	m	n	ŋ	ŋm	ñ	o	p	s	t	u	y	

== Grammar ==
Like all its close relations and neighbours, Gourmanché is a tone language; it distinguishes high, mid, and low tones. In the standard orthography the symbols c j represent palatal stops; they sound somewhat similar to English "ch" and "j" respectively.

Gourmanché preserves most of the noun-class based grammatical gender system characteristic of the Niger-Congo family, with eight classes and regular agreement of pronouns, adjectives and numerals. As with other Gur languages, the noun classes are marked by suffixes (not prefixes, as in Bantu); the suffixes come in singular/plural pairs for count nouns, e.g. tibu "tree", tiidi "trees" and are unpaired for mass nouns, e.g. ñima "water", soama "blood", gulimancema "Gourmanché language."

Gourmanché has sometimes been said to have noun prefixes as well as suffixes, agreeing in class. However, these "prefixes" are in fact proclitic particles with an article-like function. They are written as separate words in the standard orthography: bu tibu "a/the tree", i tiidi "(the) trees", mi ñima "(the) water", and they are omitted, for example, when the noun is preceded by a possessor or followed by kuli "each"; thus u nuu, "hand", ki biga "child", o joa "man" but e.g o joa muubi o biga nuu "the man holds his child's hand"; o nilo "a person" but nilo kuli "each person."

Gourmanché verbs do not agree with subjects or inflect for tense but as with almost all Oti-Volta languages, they inflect for aspect (perfective vs imperfective.) The system is complex and unpredictable, with imperfective forms differing from perfective by the addition or dropping of several different suffixes, and/or tone changes.

The language is SVO. Possessors precede their heads. Gourmanché shares with other Oti-Volta languages the characteristic that adjectives regularly compound with their head nouns; the noun precedes as a bare stem, followed by the adjective, which carries the noun class suffix appropriate to the gender and number of the head: yankpaalo "shepherd", yankpaaŋamo "good shepherd."

== Lexicography ==
There is a fairly full Gourmanché-French dictionary but no readily accessible complete grammar.

== Literature ==
A complete translation of the Bible was dedicated in September 2005.

== Animal names ==
Gulmancéma frog names and their Mooré and English equivalents (nearly all of the frogs species are consumed as food):

Gulmancéma	Mooré	Scientific name	English
Tiarli moanga	Poond youga	Afrixalus vittiger	Spiny Reed Frog
Pouang piéga	Poond youga	Afrixalus weidholzi	Weidholz's Banana Frog
Pouand boani	Poond sablga	Amietophrynus maculatus	Hallowell's Toad
Pouand koulougou	Poond sablga	Amietophrynus regularis	Egyptian Toad
Pouand gnouali	Poond miougou	Amietophrynus xeros	Desert Toad
Gnissolopouandi	Kossoilhg poondré	Bufo pentoni	Shaata Gardens Toad
Pouandi napoualé	Yoondé	Hemisus marmoratus	Shovel-nosed frog
Tiarlo	Souansga	Hildebrandtia ornata	Budgett's Burrowing Frog
Louandi moali	Louanga	Hoplobatrachus occipitalis	African tiger frog
Tiarli pieno	Boulwéoogo	Hylarana galamensis	Yellow-striped Frog
Pouand piéga	Pouand youga	Hyperolius concolor	Hallowell's Sedge Frog
Tiarli moanga	Pouand youga	Hyperolius nitidulus	
Tiarli bouanga	Poondr zembouanga	Kassina cassinoides	
Pouand bouanli	Poond bougdi	Kassina fusca	Pale Running Frog
Tiarli bouanga	Poondr zembouanga	Kassina senegalensis	Senegal Kassin's Frog
Pouand koulougou	Poond sablga	Leptopelis bufonides	Ground Tree Frog
Gnissolopoanga	Poond youga	Leptopelis viridis	Savannah Tree Frog
Patanpouandi	Louang sablga	Phrynobatrachus calcaratus	Boutry River Frog
Pouand bouanga	Louong sablga	Phrynobatrachus francisci	
Pouand bouanga	Boulwéoogo	Phrynobatrachus gutturosus	Guttural Puddle Frog
Batiarlo	Boulonboukou	Phrynobatrachus latifrons	Accra River Frog
Thialondo	Boulghin louanga	Phrynobatrachus natalensis	Natal River Frog
Pouang moanga	Poond wiilé	Phrynomantis microps	Red Rubber Frog
Foipoando	Mouonghin souansga	Ptychadena bibroni	Broad-banded Grass Frog
Tiarli Bouanga	Bouonghin souansga	Ptychadena mascareniensis	Mascarene Grassland Frog
Pouand pièga	Biihrin souanga	Ptychadena oxyrhynchus	Sharp-nosed Rocket Frog
Tiarli moanga	Poughin souansga	Ptychadena pumilio	Little Rocket Frog
Pouandi gnoanli	Louang sablga	Ptychadena schillukorum	Schilluk Ridged Frog
Tiarli gnoiarlinga	Tampou souansga	Ptychadena tellinii	Central Grassland Frog
Tiarli gnoanrga	Biihrin souansga	Ptychadena tournieri	Tournier's Rocket Frog
Pouand gourou	Boulonboukou	Ptychadena trinodis	Dakar Grassland Frog
Pouandi koulougou	Boulonboukou	Pyxicephalus edulis	Edible Frog
Pouandi bouali	Poondré	Tomopterna cryptotis	Cryptic sand frog
Louand boani	Louang boudi	Xenopus muelleri	Savanna Clawed Frog
