= Daloa =

- City, sub-prefecture, and commune
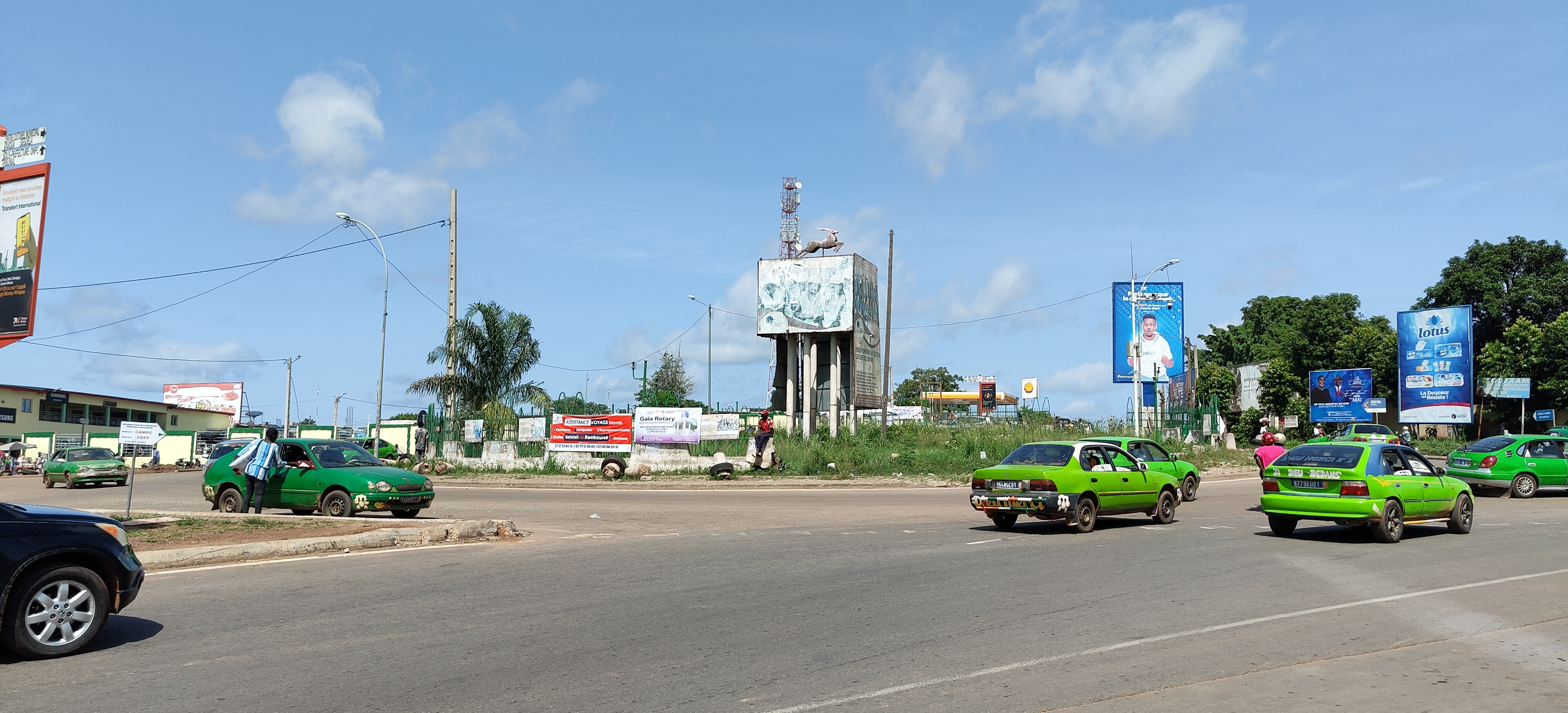
- Daloa rond-point.

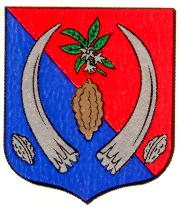
- Coat of arms

- Location in Ivory Coast
- Coordinates: 6°53′N 6°27′W
- Country: Ivory Coast
- District: Sassandra-Marahoué
- Region: Haut-Sassandra
- Department: Daloa

Area
  - Total: 1,080 km^{2} (420 sq mi)
- Elevation: 299 m (981 ft)

Population (2021 census)
  - Total: 421,871
  - Density: 391/km^{2} (1,010/sq mi)
  - City: 245,360
- (2014 census)
- Time zone: UTC+0 (GMT)

Daloa is a city in western Ivory Coast. It is the seat of both the Sassandra-Marahoué District and the Haut-Sassandra Region. It is also the seat of and a sub-prefecture of Daloa Department. Daloa is also a commune. In the 2014 census, the city had a population of 245,360, making it the third-largest city in the country. It lies to the west of Yamoussoukro, the capital of Ivory Coast. Daloa is an important trading centre, particularly for cocoa. The city is served by Daloa Airport and is home to the Roman Catholic Diocese of Daloa, with its cathedral at Cathédrale du Christ-Roi.

== History ==
=== Civil War ===
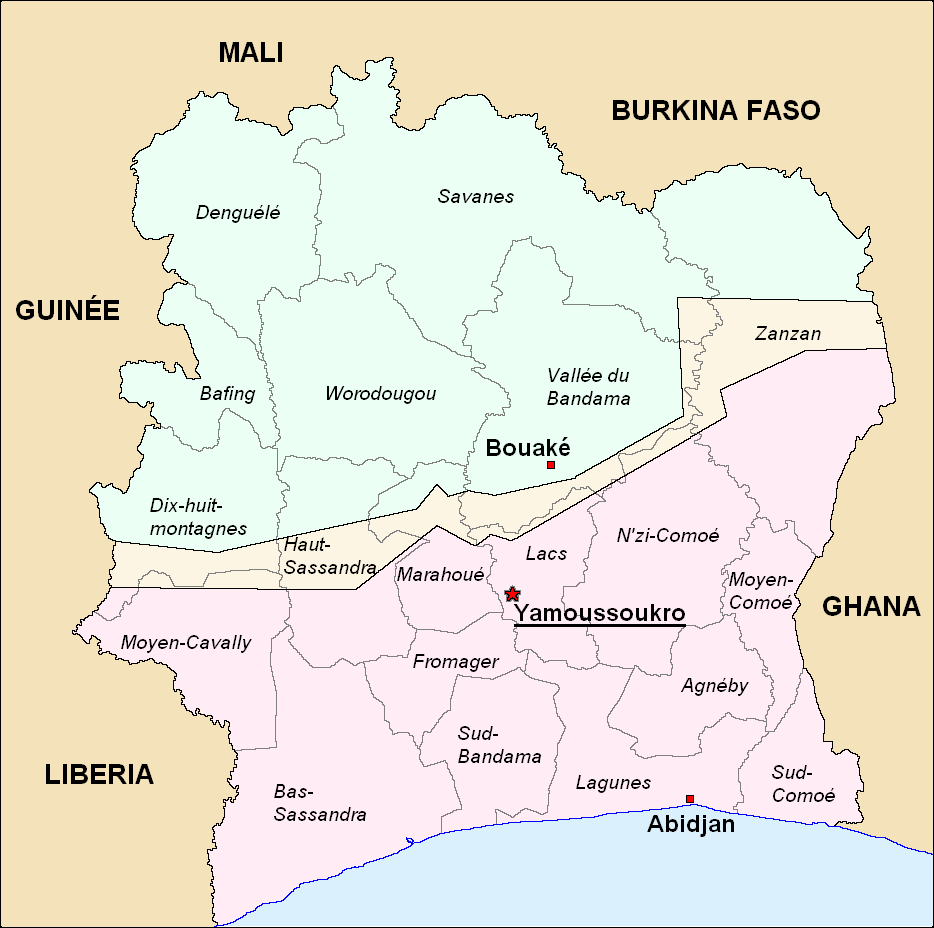
Division of territory following the First Ivorian Civil War

The town was repeatedly contested during the First Ivorian Civil War, which lasted from 2002 to 2004. Following the takeover of the town by the government on 16 October 2002, fifty civilians from the north were allegedly killed by government troops. Amnesty International described the killings as a "massacre", saying people in military uniform had killed people suspected of supporting the rebel Patriotic Movement of Côte d'Ivoire. The killings were allegedly based on their Muslim names or that the victims were nationals of Mali, Burkino Faso or Guinea. Côte d'Ivoire authorities ordered an inquiry but stated government forces had not been responsible. However, no charges were brought and the Ouagadougou Peace Agreement in March 2007 between President Laurent Gbagbo and rebel leader Guillaume Soro incorporated a general amnesty for crimes committed in this time, except for crimes against humanity, war crimes and economic crimes.

In February 2012, the International Criminal Court decided to investigate this incident.

== Politics ==
=== Administration ===
List of successive mayors
Date of election	Name	Party	Status
1980	Zézé Tapé	PDCI-RDA	Elected
1985	Denis Bra Kanon	PDCI-RDA	Elected
2013	Samba Coulibaly	RDR	Elected
2018	Gbeuly Stéphane Auguste	RHDP	Elected
2023	Gbeuly Stéphane Auguste	RHDP	Elected

== Language ==
The Bété language, a Niger-Congo language belonging to the Kru branch, is spoken in Daloa.

== Villages ==
The thirty four villages of the sub-prefecture of Daloa and their population in 2014 are:

1. Balouzon (712)
2. Daloa (245 360)
3. Dérahouan (3 603)
4. Gbokora (1 087)
5. Gogoguhé (1 206)
6. Sapia (1 268)
7. Tagoura (1 405)
8. Zaguiguia (713)
9. Békipréa (2 222)
10. Bla (950)
11. Boboua-Bahouan (4 404)
12. Bolia (2 662)
13. Brizéboua (6 997)
14. Dagbaboua (1 274)
15. Débéguhé (257)
16. Digba (1 072)
17. Gaboua (4 257)
18. Gbalagoua (864)
19. Gbétitapéa (917)
20. Guédéguhé (605)
21. Madoguhé (8 343)
22. Niouboua (2 136)
23. Séria (1 873)
24. Tahiraguhé (Guéya) (3 513)
25. Tapéguhé (2 598)
26. Tchébloguhé (2 306)
27. Toroguhé-Gueya (2 453)
28. Wandaguhé (952)
29. Zah (1 423)
30. Zakaria (731)
31. Zakoua (1 001)
32. Zaragoua (971)
33. Zépréguhé (5 372)
34. Zokoguhé-Didéguhé (3 920)

== Fauna ==
At least 30 amphibian species are found in Daloa and its surroundings. The following frog species have been recorded in Daloa.

Arthroleptidae

- Arthroleptis spp. (Arthroleptis poecilonotus complex)
- Leptopelis spiritusnoctis
- Leptopelis viridis (very common near human settlements)

Bufonidae

- Amietophrynus maculatus
- Amietophrynus regularis (very common near human settlements)

Dicroglossidae

- Hoplobatrachus occipitalis (commonly sold in markets for human consumption)

Hemisotidae

- Hemisus marmoratus

Hyperoliidae

- Afrixalus dorsalis
- Hyperolius concolor concolor (very common near human settlements)
- Hyperolius fusciventris fusciventris
- Hyperolius guttulatus
- Hyperolius nitidulus
- Hyperolius picturatus
- Hyperolius sp.
- Kassina schioetzi
- Kassina senegalensis

Microhylidae

- Phrynomantis microps

Phrynobatrachidae

- Phrynobatrachus calcaratus
- Phrynobatrachus francisci
- Phrynobatrachus gutturosus
- Phrynobatrachus latifrons

Pipidae

- Xenopus muelleri

Ptychadenidae

- Ptychadena bibroni
- Ptychadena mascareniensis
- Ptychadena oxyrhynchus
- Ptychadena tournieri
- Ptychadena pumilio
- Ptychadena tellinii

Ranidae

- Amnirana albolabris
- Amnirana galamensis

== People ==
People from Daloa include:

- the musician Ernesto Djédjé
- the academic, politician and short-story writer, Séry Bailly
- the historian and diplomat Pierre Kipré
- the Celtic footballer Vakoun Issouf Bayo

== Twin towns ==
Daloa is twinned with:

- Pau, France, since 1984
- Campinas, Brazil, since 1982
