= List of amphibians of Guinea-Bissau =

This is a list of the amphibian species recorded in Guinea-Bissau.

Arthroleptidae

- Arthroleptis poecilonotus
- Leptopelis bufonides
- Leptopelis viridis

Bufonidae

- Amietophrynus maculatus
- Amietophrynus regularis

Hemisotidae

- Hemisus guineensis

Hyperoliidae

- Hyperolius concolor
- Hyperolius nitidulus
- Hyperolius occidentalis
- Hyperolius spatzi
- Kassina senegalensis

Ranidae

- Hoplobatrachus occipitalis
- Hylarana galamensis

Pipidae

- Pseudhymenochirus merlini
- Silurana tropicalis

Phrynobatrachidae

- Phrynobatrachus calcaratus
- Phrynobatrachus francisci
- Phrynobatrachus minutus
- Phrynobatrachus natalensis
- Phrynobatrachus tokba

Ptychadenidae

- Ptychadena ansorgii
- Ptychadena bibroni
- Ptychadena mascareniensis
- Ptychadena oxyrhynchus
- Ptychadena pumilio
