= Mozambique ridged frog =

Conservation status
- Least Concern (IUCN 3.1)

Scientific classification
- Kingdom: Animalia
- Phylum: Chordata
- Class: Amphibia
- Order: Anura
- Family: Ptychadenidae
- Genus: Ptychadena
- Species: P. mossambica

Binomial name
- Ptychadena mossambica (Peters, 1854)

Synonyms
- Rana Mossambica Peters, 1854; Ptychadena vernayi (FitzSimons, 1932)

Species of frog

The Mozambique ridged frog (Ptychadena mossambica, also known as the broad-banded grass frog, Mozambique grass frog, Mozambique grassland frog, or single-striped grass frog) is a species of frog in the family Ptychadenidae. These frogs can swim fairly well, jump far and can crawl with ease through dense plants. Their strong hindlegs can launch them up to three metres into the air in a single bound.

== Taxonomy ==
Named after Mozambique where the species was first identified.

== Conservation status ==
Not threatened.

== Description ==
Length: 45–50 mm, maximum 53 mm

Body Internarial distance greater than snout-nostril distance.

Above Dark grey-brown to chocolate brown or green. A broad creamy to orange-brown vertebral band from snout to vent, bordered by elongated blackish spots. Snout without prominent pale triangle, not paler than rest of body. 6 or more dorsolateral skin ridges prominent, continuous only as far as the hump of the back and creamy-white. Dark brown blotches, smaller than eye, between vertebral bands and dorsolateral ridges.

Tympanum Prominent. Slightly smaller than eye.

Underside Creamy-white, sometimes with grey mottling along lower jaw on throat and on hind part of abdomen. Thighs and groin often pale yellow. Skin smooth.

Forelimbs Arm comparatively short.

Hindlimbs Foot shorter than tibia. There is a pale line sometimes present along the upper surface of the tibia. Back of thigh dark grey, with yellow mottling sometimes forming irregular lines. Webbing moderate. 2,75 to 3 phalanges of fourth toe and one phalanx of fifth toe free of webbing. Tarsal fold present. Inner and outer metatarsal tubercles present. Row of tubercles under fourth toe.

Sexual dimorphism Gular slits in male not parallel to jaw-line on lateral view.

== Key identification points ==
- Back of thighs with yellow mottling, sometimes forming irregular lines (distinct from P. subpunctata, P. taenioscelis and P. guibei).
- Internarial distance greater than snout-nostril distance (distinct from other species except P. guibei, P. mapacha and P. schillukorum).
- Length of foot less than tibia length (distinct from P. guibei, P. mascareniensis, P. subpunctata and P. taenioscelis).
- Pale line on tibia sometimes present (distinct from P. anchietae, P. oxyrhychus, P. schillukorum and P. taenioscelis, although sometimes present also in P. subpunctata).
- Outer metatarsal tubercle present (distinct from other species except P. guibei, P. mapacha and P. schillukorum).
- Broad pale band extends from rump to snout but snout not paler than the rest of the body (distinct from P. anchietae, P. oxyrhynchus, P. schillukorum and P. subpunctata).
- Mottling on the back of the thighs is irregular with no discernable pattern.

== Similar species ==
This species is smaller than most other Ptychadena species. It is similar to the Sharp-nosed Grass Frog (P. oxyrhynchus). It is less conspicuous than the Plain Grass Frog (P. anchietae) and hides by day, calling from concealed positions. Previously considered a race of the Mascarene Grass Frog (Rana mascarenienis mossambica Loveridge); the length from the heel to the toes in P. mascareniensis is greater than the length of the tibia. The Dwarf Grass Frog (P. taenioscelis) is smaller (less than 35 mm), with stripes down the backside of the thighs.

== Distribution ==
It is found in South Africa from northern Zululand through the Lowveld and Kruger National Park northwards to Botswana, Eswatini, Kenya, Malawi, Mozambique, Namibia, Tanzania, Zambia, Zimbabwe, and possibly Angola. Best viewing: Kruger-Lowveld (South Africa), Okavango (Botswana), Tshaneni (Eswatini).

== Call ==
The call of these frog is a series of harsh nasal kwe-kwe or wah-wah-wah clucks, repeated at the rate of two per second, much like the quacking of the Egyptian Goose. Males call from concealed positions in grass tussocks at the edge of water on shores of marshes and pans or even several metres away from water. Until vegetation establishes itself after winter, males may call along the water's edge in completely exposed positions. Calling peakings after dark till about midnight.

== Habitat ==
Its natural habitats is flooded grass and rush around intermittent (pans) and permanent freshwater marshes (vleis), ponds or streams in a variety of bushveld vegetation types at altitudes of 200 to 1 200 m in dry savanna, thicket and subtropical or tropical dry and seasonally wet or flooded lowland grassland, but also moist savanna, subtropical or tropical dry forest, subtropical or tropical dry and moist shrubland, swamps, intermittent freshwater lakes, arable land, pastureland and water storage areas.

== Habits ==
When the pools in its preferred habitats dry up, the frogs often seek refuge in deep cracks and crevices in the underlying mud that is busy drying. Here they often spend the dry winter months, and become active after the first spring rains. When disturbed, it jumps away from the water to vegetation, crawls beneath it and is concealed.

== Reproduction ==
In the Kruger National Park 315 eggs were collected from a single female. Each egg is 1,2 mm in diameter and surrounded by a transparent jelly about 3 mm in diameter. The eggs sink to the bottom. The animal pole of the egg is a dark grey-brown while the vegetable pole is a creamy yellow-white. The eggs develop very quickly.

== Tadpole ==
Unknown.
