= Ptychadena pujoli =

Conservation status
- Data Deficient (IUCN 3.1)

Scientific classification
- Kingdom: Animalia
- Phylum: Chordata
- Class: Amphibia
- Order: Anura
- Family: Ptychadenidae
- Genus: Ptychadena
- Species: P. pujoli

Binomial name
- Ptychadena pujoli Lamotte and Ohler, 1997

Species of frog

Ptychadena pujoli is a species of frog in the family Ptychadenidae. It is known from Macenta and Sérédou in Guinea, Sukurela in Sierra Leone, and Mount Nimba (its type locality) in Liberia and Ivory Coast. Description of Ptychadena pujoli is based on old museum specimens, and very little is known about the ecology of this relatively recently (1997) described species.

== Taxonomy ==
Before Ptychadena pujoli was described in 1997, it was mistakenly reported as Ptychadena bibroni (Hallowell, 1845); this was caused by a mistake in the original species description by Edward Hallowell. Ptychadena pujoli belongs to the so-called "Ptychadena stenocephala group", characterized by little webbing in the feet and by having sacral folds on the dorsum and tubercles on the feet. The other species in this group are Ptychadena arnei, Ptychadena ingeri, and Ptychadena tournieri; Ptychadena pujoli is most similar to Ptychadena tournieri.

== Description ==
Males measure 39–45 mm (1.5–1.8 in) and females 46–51 mm (1.8–2.0 in) in snout–vent length; it is the largest species in the Ptychadena stenocephala group. The legs are relatively long. The webbing in feet leaves two phalanges of toe V free (only one in P. tournieri). Median dorsal fold is absent.

== Habitat and conservation ==
Habitat requirements of this species are poorly known, but it has been found in swamps in savanna and grassland in hilly areas. Presumably it breeds in temporary pools, as other species in the genus.

Population trends of Ptychadena pujoli and threats to it are unknown. The International Union for Conservation of Nature (IUCN) has assessed it as "Data Deficient".
