= Ptychadena ingeri =

Conservation status
- Data Deficient (IUCN 3.1)

Scientific classification
- Kingdom: Animalia
- Phylum: Chordata
- Class: Amphibia
- Order: Anura
- Family: Ptychadenidae
- Genus: Ptychadena
- Species: P. ingeri

Binomial name
- Ptychadena ingeri Perret, 1991

Species of frog in the family Ptychadenidae

Ptychadena ingeri is a species of frog in the family Ptychadenidae. The species is native to the northeastern Democratic Republic of the Congo where it is known from the Garamba National Park. It is likely to occur more widely, possibly reaching into South Sudan. It is named after Robert F. Inger, an American zoologist from the Field Museum of Natural History. The common name Inger's grassland frog has been coined for it.

== Description ==
Adult males of P. ingeri, based on two specimens only, measure 30–33 mm (1.2–1.3 in) in snout–vent length (SVL), and adult females measure 39–42 mm (1.5–1.7 in) SVL. It is the only member of the P. stenocephala group to have a mid-dorsal skin fold. The legs are relatively long. The shared characteristics of this group are reduced toe webbing, sacral folds on the back, and metatarsal tubercles on the feet. Specifically, one and a half phalanges of the toe V are free of webbing in P. ingeri.

== Habitat and conservation ==
P. ingeri occurs in open and wooded humid savanna in association with marshes and temporary as well as permanent waterbodies, including streams. It presumably breeds in water. Population trends of P. ingeri are unknown, but it occurs in an area of low human impact and is unlikely to face significant threats. It appeared to be common at the time of collection in 1959. The International Union for Conservation of Nature (IUCN) has assessed it as "data deficient". The type locality is a protected area.
