= Ptychadena boettgeri =

Scientific classification
- Domain: Eukaryota
- Kingdom: Animalia
- Phylum: Chordata
- Class: Amphibia
- Order: Anura
- Family: Ptychadenidae
- Genus: Ptychadena
- Species: P. boettgeri

Binomial name
- Ptychadena boettgeri (Pfeffer, 1893)

Synonyms
- Rana böttgeri Pfeffer, 1893; Rana (Ptychadena) boettgeri De Witte, 1921; Ptychadena boettgeri (Pfeffer, 1893)

Species of frog

Ptychadena boettgeri is a species of frog in the family Ptychadenidae. It is only known from its type locality near Quilimane, Mozambique.
