= Ptychadena upembae =

Conservation status
- Least Concern (IUCN 3.1)

Scientific classification
- Kingdom: Animalia
- Phylum: Chordata
- Class: Amphibia
- Order: Anura
- Family: Ptychadenidae
- Genus: Ptychadena
- Species: P. upembae

Binomial name
- Ptychadena upembae (Schmidt & Inger, 1959)

Species of frog

Ptychadena upembae is a species of frog in the family Ptychadenidae. It is found in Angola, Democratic Republic of the Congo, Malawi, Mozambique, Zambia, and possibly Tanzania. Its natural habitats are moist savanna, subtropical or tropical seasonally wet or flooded lowland grassland, and intermittent freshwater marshes.
