= Ptychadena chrysogaster =

Conservation status
- Least Concern (IUCN 3.1)

Scientific classification
- Kingdom: Animalia
- Phylum: Chordata
- Class: Amphibia
- Order: Anura
- Family: Ptychadenidae
- Genus: Ptychadena
- Species: P. chrysogaster

Binomial name
- Ptychadena chrysogaster Laurent, 1954

Synonyms
- Rana (Ptychadena) chrysogaster (Laurent, 1954)

Species of frog

Ptychadena chrysogaster is a species of frog in the family Ptychadenidae. It is found in eastern Democratic Republic of the Congo (Kivu), Burundi, Rwanda, and southwestern Uganda, with an isolated record from Serengeti, Tanzania. Common names yellow-bellied ridged frog, golden-bellied rocket frog, and Rwanda grassland frog have been coined for it.

Ptychadena chrysogaster is a forest species associated with swampy areas on the forest edge at elevations of 1,200–1,799 m (3,937–5,902 ft) above sea level. It can also occur in disturbed habitats, including roadside ditches. Breeding takes place in streams. It is a common and adaptable species that is not facing major threats. Furthermore, it occurs in several national parks: Kibale and Bwindi National Parks in Uganda, and Serengeti National Park in Tanzania.
