= Ptychadena erlangeri =

Conservation status
- Near Threatened (IUCN 3.1)

Scientific classification
- Kingdom: Animalia
- Phylum: Chordata
- Class: Amphibia
- Order: Anura
- Family: Ptychadenidae
- Genus: Ptychadena
- Species: P. erlangeri

Binomial name
- Ptychadena erlangeri (Ahl, 1924)

Species of frog

Ptychadena erlangeri is a species of frog in the family Ptychadenidae. It is endemic to Ethiopia.

Its natural habitats are subtropical or tropical moist montane forest, freshwater marshes, and intermittent freshwater marshes. It is threatened by habitat loss.
