= Ptychadena perreti =

Conservation status
- Least Concern (IUCN 3.1)

Scientific classification
- Kingdom: Animalia
- Phylum: Chordata
- Class: Amphibia
- Order: Anura
- Family: Ptychadenidae
- Genus: Ptychadena
- Species: P. perreti

Binomial name
- Ptychadena perreti Guibé & Lamotte, 1958

Synonyms
- Rana perreti (Guibé and Lamotte, 1958)

Species of frog

Ptychadena perreti is a species of frog in the family Ptychadenidae. It is found in Cameroon, Gabon, Republic of the Congo, southwestern Central African Republic and northern Democratic Republic of the Congo. It might occur in the Cabinda enclave of Angola and mainland Equatorial Guinea. Common name Perret's grassland frog has been coined for it.

== Etymology ==
The specific name perreti honours Jean-Luc Perret, a Swiss herpetologist who specialized in African amphibians.

== Description ==
Adult males from the Garamba National Park measure 35–49 mm (1.4–1.9 in) and adult females 46–57 mm (1.8–2.2 in) in snout–vent length. The body is moderately stocky in females but slender in males. The limbs are long and slender. The snout is long and pointed. The toes are extensively webbed. The dorsum is clay brown with rectangular black spots. The vertebral band is golden brown. The throat, chest, and knees often have dark spots. The legs have complete crossbars, and the backs of the thighs have irregular yellowish green stripes. The venter is whitish with bright lemon-yellow or yellowish green wash.

== Habitat and conservation ==
Ptychadena perreti inhabits secondary and anthropogenic habitats such as agricultural areas, degraded forest, farm bush, and marshy areas. Breeding takes place in puddles, ditches, and ruts. It is a common species that tolerates some habitat disturbance, but it is still likely to suffer from habitat loss from agricultural development, logging, and human settlements. It occurs in many protected areas.
