= Rough ridged frog =

Conservation status
- Least Concern (IUCN 3.1)

Scientific classification
- Kingdom: Animalia
- Phylum: Chordata
- Class: Amphibia
- Order: Anura
- Family: Ptychadenidae
- Genus: Ptychadena
- Species: P. bunoderma

Binomial name
- Ptychadena bunoderma (Boulenger, 1907)

Species of amphibian

The rough ridged frog (Ptychadena bunoderma) is a species of frog in the family Ptychadenidae. It is found in Angola, Zambia, and possibly Democratic Republic of the Congo. Its natural habitats are moist savanna and subtropical or tropical seasonally wet or flooded lowland grassland.
