= Ptychadena submascareniensis =

Conservation status
- Data Deficient (IUCN 3.1)

Scientific classification
- Kingdom: Animalia
- Phylum: Chordata
- Class: Amphibia
- Order: Anura
- Family: Ptychadenidae
- Genus: Ptychadena
- Species: P. submascareniensis

Binomial name
- Ptychadena submascareniensis (Guibé & Lamotte, 1953)

Synonyms
- Rana submascareniensis Guibé and Lamotte, 1953

Species of frog

Ptychadena submascareniensis (common name: Guinea grassland frog) is a species of frog in the family Ptychadenidae. This West African frog is found on the Nimba Range of Ivory Coast, Guinea, and Liberia, and on the Loma Mountains of Sierra Leone.

== Description ==
Ptychadena submascareniensis is a small frog species; males measure 26–29 mm (1.0–1.1 in) and females 26–33 mm (1.0–1.3 in) in snout–vent length. Males have paired, lateral vocal sacs. The dorsum has five pairs of longitudinal ridges; the skin between the ridges is slightly granulated. There are some scattered warts on the eyelids and on the flanks. The ventral skin is smooth. The head is longer than wide and with a moderately pointed snout. The tympanum is 2/3 to 3/4 of the eye diameter. The legs are long and slender. Male vocalizations are unknown.

The tadpoles have a dark and ovoid body. The tail fin and axis are spotted, and the tail fin converges evenly towards the tip. Specimens 19–20 mm (0.75–0.79 in) in length have hind legs and are thus approaching metamorphosis.

== Habitat and conservation ==
The natural habitats of Ptychadena submascareniensis are savannas and grasslands. It breeds in shallow puddles. On Mount Nimba, these frogs were found in shallow puddles in March–October.

Because there is little recent information about this species, the International Union for Conservation of Nature (IUCN) has assessed it as "Data Deficient". Threats to it are unknown, but it probably is threatened by mining on Mount Nimba. It occurs in the Mount Nimba Strict Nature Reserve, but is absent from Comoé National Park.
