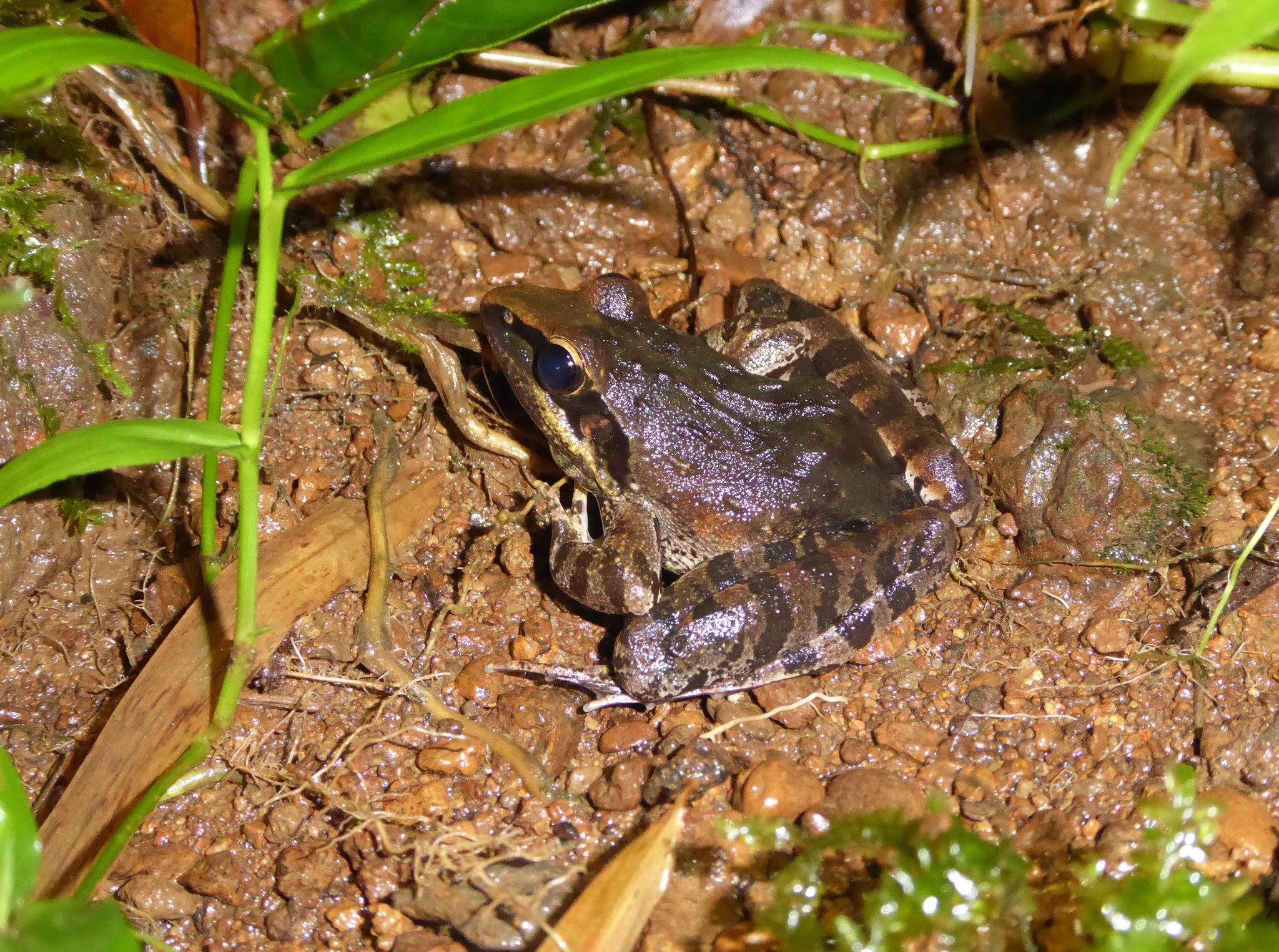

Conservation status
- Endangered (IUCN 3.1)

Scientific classification
- Kingdom: Animalia
- Phylum: Chordata
- Class: Amphibia
- Order: Anura
- Family: Ptychadenidae
- Genus: Ptychadena
- Species: P. newtoni

Binomial name
- Ptychadena newtoni (Bocage, 1886)
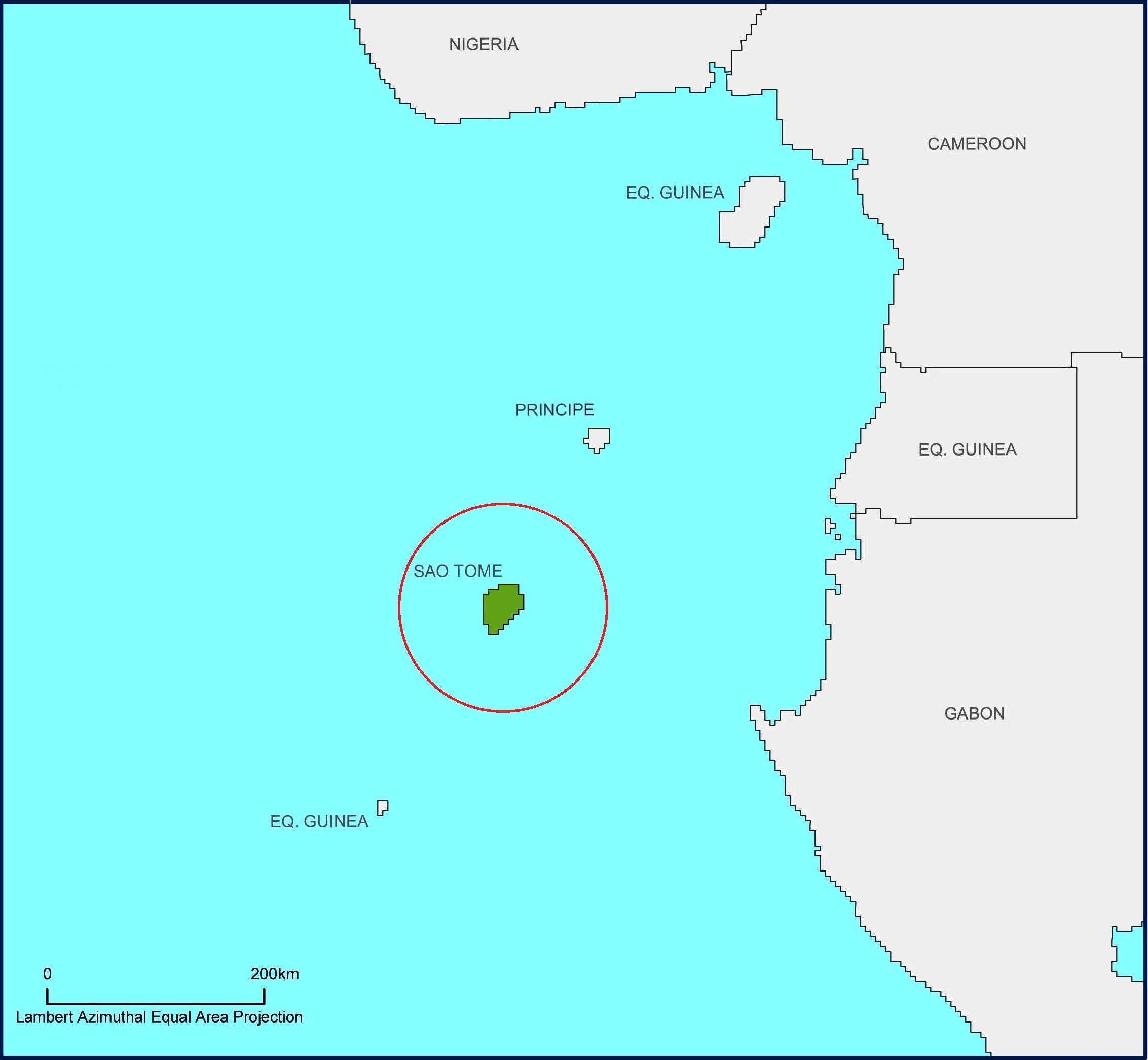
- range

= Ptychadena newtoni =

Species of frog

Ptychadena newtoni is a species of frog in the family Ptychadenidae. It is endemic to the island of São Tomé in São Tomé and Príncipe, where it occurs up to 600 metres elevation. Its natural habitats are swamps, freshwater marshes, arable land, plantations, rural gardens, urban areas, heavily degraded former forest, ponds, and canals and ditches. It is threatened by habitat loss. The animal was first described as Rana newtoni by Bocage in 1886. The species is named after Francisco Xavier Oakley de Aguiar Newton (1864–1909).
