= Ptychadena nilotica =

Conservation status
- Least Concern (IUCN 3.1)

Scientific classification
- Kingdom: Animalia
- Phylum: Chordata
- Class: Amphibia
- Order: Anura
- Family: Ptychadenidae
- Genus: Ptychadena
- Species: P. nilotica

Binomial name
- Ptychadena nilotica (Seetzen, 1855)

Synonyms
- Rana nilotica Seetzen, 1855; Ptychadena filwoha Largen, 1997

Species of frog

Ptychadena nilotica is a species of frog in the family Ptychadenidae. It is found in the upper reaches of the Nile and its major tributaries in Egypt, Sudan, South Sudan, Ethiopia, Burundi, Rwanda, Uganda, Kenya, Tanzania, Democratic Republic of Congo, and possibly Djibouti, Eritrea, and Somalia. Its natural habitats are wetlands near rivers, large lakes, swamps, and freshwater marshes and springs., as well as dry savanna, subtropical or tropical dry shrubland, arable land, irrigation canals and ditches.
