= Ptychadena uzungwensis =

Conservation status
- Least Concern (IUCN 3.1)

Scientific classification
- Kingdom: Animalia
- Phylum: Chordata
- Class: Amphibia
- Order: Anura
- Family: Ptychadenidae
- Genus: Ptychadena
- Species: P. uzungwensis

Binomial name
- Ptychadena uzungwensis (Loveridge, 1932)

Synonyms
- Rana mascareniensis uzungwensis Loveridge, 1932; Ptychadena macrocephala Laurent, 1952

Species of frog

Ptychadena uzungwensis is a species of frog in the family Ptychadenidae. It is found on the East African Plateau in Rwanda, Burundi, and Tanzania in the north and then southward to eastern Democratic Republic of the Congo, northern Angola, Zambia, Malawi, Zimbabwe and uplands of Mozambique. Its common names include Udzungwa ridged frog and Udzungwa grass frog, where "Udzungwa" may also be written Uzungwa, following the spelling that Arthur Loveridge used in the species description for the Udzungwa Mountains, the type locality.

== Description ==
Males grow to 42 mm (1.7 in) and females to 48 mm (1.9 in) in snout–vent length. The longitudinal ridges on the dorsum are broken, and there are two distinct ridges on the snout. There are light dorsolateral skin folds running along each side of the body. The dorsum is dark brown with darker brown spots, and there is a light mid-dorsal stripe. The back of the thigh is faintly spotted, but may in some individuals join to form a horizontal band. Males have yellow throats and yellow patches near the groin. The toes have reduced webbing.

== Habitat and conservation ==
Ptychadena uzungwensis lives in medium- to high-altitude grasslands (800–2,300 m (2,600–7,500 ft) above sea level) near pools, seepages, dambos and permanent sponges, its presumed breeding habitat. Male call from shallow water. Specific threats to this species are not known, but it is unlikely to face significant threats. It occurs in a number protected areas, including the Upemba National Park in the southeastern Democratic Republic of Congo.
