= Ptychadena perplicata =

Conservation status
- Least Concern (IUCN 3.1)

Scientific classification
- Kingdom: Animalia
- Phylum: Chordata
- Class: Amphibia
- Order: Anura
- Family: Ptychadenidae
- Genus: Ptychadena
- Species: P. perplicata

Binomial name
- Ptychadena perplicata Laurent, 1964

Species of frog

Ptychadena perplicata is a species of frog in the family Ptychadenidae. It is found in Angola, Zambia, and possibly Democratic Republic of the Congo. Its natural habitats are moist savanna and intermittent freshwater marshes.
