= Ptychadena grandisonae =

Conservation status
- Least Concern (IUCN 3.1)

Scientific classification
- Kingdom: Animalia
- Phylum: Chordata
- Class: Amphibia
- Order: Anura
- Family: Ptychadenidae
- Genus: Ptychadena
- Species: P. grandisonae

Binomial name
- Ptychadena grandisonae Laurent, 1954

Species of frog

Ptychadena grandisonae is a species of frog in the family Ptychadenidae. It is found in Angola, Democratic Republic of the Congo, Rwanda, Tanzania, Zambia, and possibly Burundi. Its natural habitats are moist savanna, subtropical or tropical seasonally wet or flooded lowland grassland, subtropical or tropical high-altitude grassland, and swamps.
