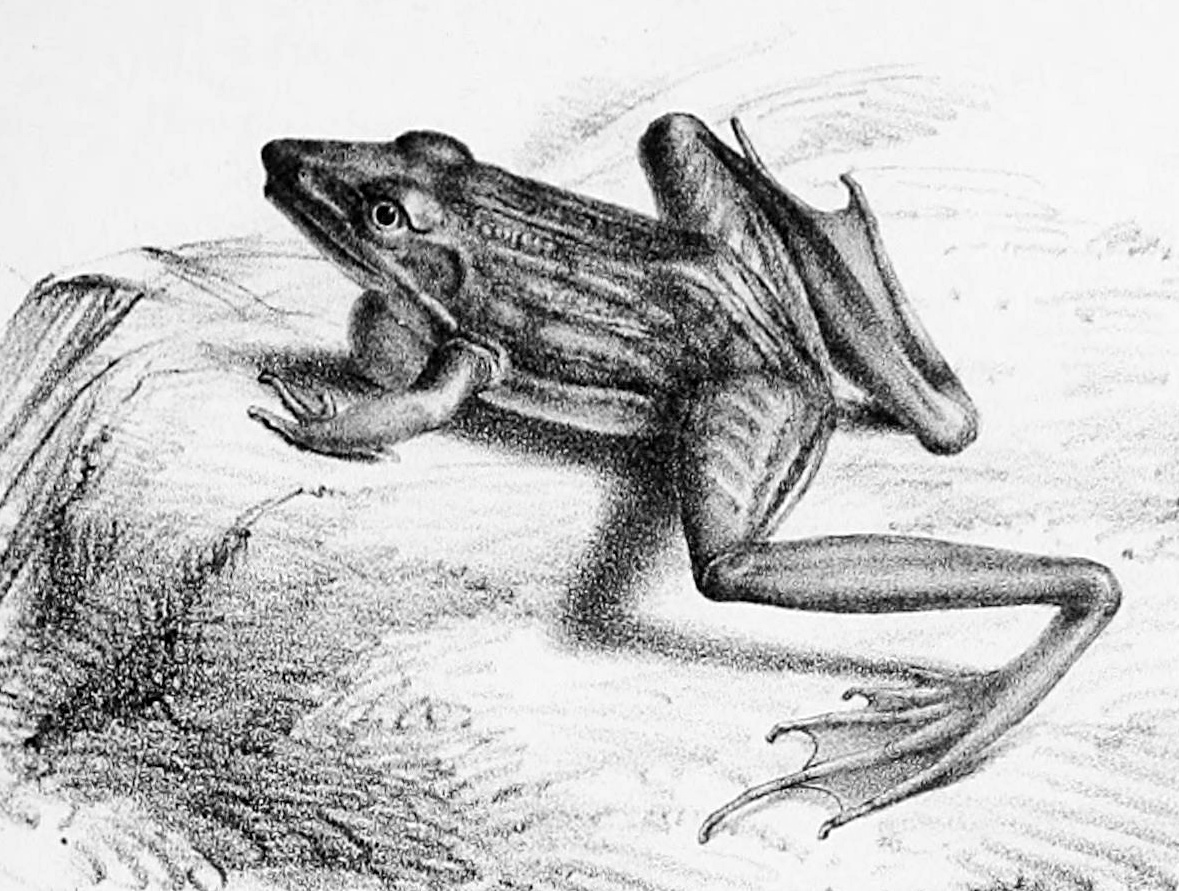

Conservation status
- Least Concern (IUCN 3.1)

Scientific classification
- Kingdom: Animalia
- Phylum: Chordata
- Class: Amphibia
- Order: Anura
- Family: Ptychadenidae
- Genus: Ptychadena
- Species: P. superciliaris

Binomial name
- Ptychadena superciliaris (Günther, 1858)

= Ptychadena superciliaris =

Species of frog

Ptychadena superciliaris is a species of frog in the family Ptychadenidae, found in Ivory Coast, Ghana, Guinea, Liberia, and Sierra Leone. Its natural habitats are subtropical or tropical moist lowland forest and intermittent freshwater marshes.The species is threatened by habitat loss.
