= Ptychadena neumanni =

Conservation status
- Least Concern (IUCN 3.1)

Scientific classification
- Kingdom: Animalia
- Phylum: Chordata
- Class: Amphibia
- Order: Anura
- Family: Ptychadenidae
- Genus: Ptychadena
- Species: P. neumanni

Binomial name
- Ptychadena neumanni (Ahl, 1924)

Synonyms
- Ptychadena largeni Perret, 1994

Species of frog

Ptychadena neumanni is a species of frog in the family Ptychadenidae. It is endemic to Ethiopia.

Its natural habitats are subtropical or tropical moist lowland forest, subtropical or tropical moist montane forest, subtropical or tropical moist shrubland, subtropical or tropical high-elevation shrubland, subtropical or tropical high-elevation grassland, rivers, intermittent rivers, swamps, freshwater marshes, intermittent freshwater marshes, arable land, rural gardens, heavily degraded former forest, ponds, and canals and ditches. It is threatened by habitat loss.
