= Ptychadena retropunctata =

Conservation status
- Least Concern (IUCN 3.1)

Scientific classification
- Kingdom: Animalia
- Phylum: Chordata
- Class: Amphibia
- Order: Anura
- Family: Ptychadenidae
- Genus: Ptychadena
- Species: P. retropunctata

Binomial name
- Ptychadena retropunctata (Angel, 1949)

Species of frog

Ptychadena retropunctata is a species of frog in the family Ptychadenidae. It is found in Guinea, Liberia, Sierra Leone, and possibly Ivory Coast. Its natural habitats are moist savanna, subtropical or tropical seasonally wet or flooded lowland grassland, subtropical or tropical high-altitude grassland, and intermittent freshwater marshes. It is threatened by habitat loss.
