= Ptychadena straeleni =

Conservation status
- Least Concern (IUCN 3.1)

Scientific classification
- Kingdom: Animalia
- Phylum: Chordata
- Class: Amphibia
- Order: Anura
- Family: Ptychadenidae
- Genus: Ptychadena
- Species: P. straeleni

Binomial name
- Ptychadena straeleni (Inger, 1968)

Species of frog

Ptychadena straeleni is a species of frog in the family Ptychadenidae. It is found in Cameroon, Central African Republic, Democratic Republic of the Congo, possibly Chad, and possibly Sudan. Its natural habitats are dry savanna, moist savanna, subtropical or tropical seasonally wet or flooded lowland grassland, subtropical or tropical high-altitude grassland, freshwater lakes, and freshwater marshes.
