= Victoria ridged frog =

Conservation status
- Least Concern (IUCN 3.1)

Scientific classification
- Kingdom: Animalia
- Phylum: Chordata
- Class: Amphibia
- Order: Anura
- Family: Ptychadenidae
- Genus: Ptychadena
- Species: P. aequiplicata

Binomial name
- Ptychadena aequiplicata (Werner, 1898)

Species of frog

The Victoria ridged frog (Ptychadena aequiplicata) is a species of frog in the family Ptychadenidae. It is found in Benin, Cameroon, Central African Republic, Republic of the Congo, Democratic Republic of the Congo, Ivory Coast, Equatorial Guinea, Gabon, Ghana, Guinea, Liberia, Nigeria, possibly Angola, and possibly Togo. Its natural habitats are subtropical or tropical moist lowland forest, intermittent freshwater marshes, and heavily degraded former forest. It is threatened by habitat loss.
