= Ptychadena cooperi =

Conservation status
- Least Concern (IUCN 3.1)

Scientific classification
- Kingdom: Animalia
- Phylum: Chordata
- Class: Amphibia
- Order: Anura
- Family: Ptychadenidae
- Genus: Ptychadena
- Species: P. cooperi

Binomial name
- Ptychadena cooperi (Parker, 1930)

Species of frog

Ptychadena cooperi is a species of frog in the family Ptychadenidae. It is endemic to Ethiopia.

Its natural habitats are subtropical or tropical moist montane forest, subtropical or tropical high-altitude grassland, rivers, intermittent rivers, freshwater marshes, intermittent freshwater marshes, pastureland, rural gardens, urban areas, and seasonally flooded agricultural land. It is threatened by habitat loss.
