= Ptychadena nana =

Conservation status
- Endangered (IUCN 3.1)

Scientific classification
- Kingdom: Animalia
- Phylum: Chordata
- Class: Amphibia
- Order: Anura
- Family: Ptychadenidae
- Genus: Ptychadena
- Species: P. nana

Binomial name
- Ptychadena nana Perret, 1980

Synonyms
- Rana (Ptychadena) nana (Perret, 1980)

Species of frog

Ptychadena nana is a species of frog in the family Ptychadenidae. It is endemic to Ethiopia. It is only known with certainty from its type locality, Arussi Mountains, in the Ethiopian Highlands; these mountains are also referred to as the Arsi Mountains. There is uncertainty regarding reports from elsewhere (in particular, Bale Mountains), which perhaps refer to other, possibly undescribed species. Freilich and colleagues found specimens from the Bale Mountains to be larger than "normal" Ptychadena nana, but that molecular data clustered them with other P. nana. Common names Somali grassland frog and smallest grass frog have been coined for it.

== Description ==
Adult males measure 24–27 mm (0.9–1.1 in) and adult females 25–30 mm (1.0–1.2 in) in snout–vent length, or respectively 30–33 mm (1.2–1.3 in) and 32–35 mm (1.3–1.4 in), according to Freilich and colleagues. The tympanum is distinct. The hindlimbs are relatively short. Skin folds on the back incomplete, often more or less extensively and irregularly fragmented. The toes are slightly webbed. Adult males have external vocal sacs.

== Habitat and conservation ==
Ptychadena nana is a mountain grassland species that occurs at elevations of 2,000–3,000 m (6,600–9,800 ft) or 2,584–3,023 m (8,478–9,918 ft) above sea level, depending on the source. It has been reported as locally abundant and being found near streams, in cattle grazing fields and in mosaics of cropland and other natural vegetation, and in roadside pools in rural towns and villages.

In the IUCN Red List of Threatened Species, Ptychadena nana is listed as "endangered" because of its small known range and threats to its habitat. It is not known to occur in any protected areas.
