= Ptychadena longirostris =

Conservation status
- Least Concern (IUCN 3.1)

Scientific classification
- Kingdom: Animalia
- Phylum: Chordata
- Class: Amphibia
- Order: Anura
- Family: Ptychadenidae
- Genus: Ptychadena
- Species: P. longirostris

Binomial name
- Ptychadena longirostris (Peters, 1870)

Species of frog

Ptychadena longirostris is a species of frog in the family Ptychadenidae. It is found in Côte d'Ivoire, Ghana, Guinea, Liberia, Nigeria, and Sierra Leone, and in possibly in Benin, Senegal, and Togo. Its natural habitats are subtropical or tropical moist lowland forest, intermittent freshwater marshes, and canals and ditches. It is threatened by habitat loss.
