= Ptychadena porosissima =

Conservation status
- Least Concern (IUCN 3.1)

Scientific classification
- Kingdom: Animalia
- Phylum: Chordata
- Class: Amphibia
- Order: Anura
- Family: Ptychadenidae
- Genus: Ptychadena
- Species: P. porosissima

Binomial name
- Ptychadena porosissima (Steindachner, 1867)

Species of frog

Ptychadena porosissima is a species of frog in the family Ptychadenidae. It is found in Angola, Democratic Republic of the Congo, Ethiopia, Kenya, Malawi, Rwanda, South Africa, Eswatini, Tanzania, Uganda, Zambia, Zimbabwe, possibly Burundi, possibly Lesotho, and possibly Mozambique. Its natural habitats are temperate forest, subtropical or tropical moist montane forest, moist savanna, subtropical or tropical moist shrubland, temperate grassland, subtropical or tropical seasonally wet or flooded lowland grassland, subtropical or tropical high-altitude grassland, swamps, intermittent freshwater marshes, pastureland, rural gardens, and heavily degraded former forest.
