= Ptychadena wadei =

Conservation status
- Data Deficient (IUCN 3.1)

Scientific classification
- Kingdom: Animalia
- Phylum: Chordata
- Class: Amphibia
- Order: Anura
- Family: Ptychadenidae
- Genus: Ptychadena
- Species: P. wadei

Binomial name
- Ptychadena wadei Largen, 2000

Species of frog

Ptychadena wadei is a species of frog in the family Ptychadenidae. It is endemic to Ethiopia and only known from a small area southeast of Lake Tana, in the upper reaches of the Blue Nile. The specific name wadei honours Edward O.Z. Wade, an English illustrator and herpetology enthusiast who drew some of the illustrations accompanying the species description. Common name Wade's grass frog has been coined for it.

== Description ==
Adult males measure 30–31 mm (1.2–1.2 in) in snout–vent length. The type series does not include adult females; the largest, still immature female was 30 mm (1.2 in). The head is longer than it is broad; the snout is moderately pointed. The tympanum is conspicuous. The toes are moderately webbed. The hindlimbs are relatively short. The dorsum has five pairs of longitudinal skin folds that are nearly complete. A pale vertebral stripe extends from the tip of the snout to the supra-anal region; some individuals have also a weak, even paler vertebral stripe. There are numerous small dark brown blotches arranged in rows along the skin folds, except for the outermost ones. A dark streak passes from snout tip through the eye and the tympanum, ending behind the forelimb insertion. The upper lip and infra-tympanic ridge are pale. The tibia have 2–5 transverse bars, often narrowly interrupted by a tibial line. The venter is immaculate, cream. Males have bicoloured vocal sacs.

== Habitat and conservation ==
Ptychadena wadei is known from montane grassland and shrubland at elevations of 1,800–1,850 m (5,910–6,070 ft) above sea level. Breeding takes place in temporary pools and streamlets.

Threats to this species are poorly known, but it is likely to be affected by habitat degradation, primarily caused by agricultural development, expanding human settlements, and overgrazing by livestock. It is not known to occur in any protected area.
