= Ptychadena christyi =

Conservation status
- Least Concern (IUCN 3.1)

Scientific classification
- Kingdom: Animalia
- Phylum: Chordata
- Class: Amphibia
- Order: Anura
- Family: Ptychadenidae
- Genus: Ptychadena
- Species: P. christyi

Binomial name
- Ptychadena christyi (Boulenger, 1919)

Species of amphibian

Ptychadena christyi is a species of frog in the family Ptychadenidae. It is found in Democratic Republic of the Congo and Uganda. Its natural habitats are subtropical or tropical moist lowland forest and intermittent freshwater marshes.
