= Broadley's ridged frog =

Conservation status
- Near Threatened (IUCN 3.1)

Scientific classification
- Kingdom: Animalia
- Phylum: Chordata
- Class: Amphibia
- Order: Anura
- Family: Ptychadenidae
- Genus: Ptychadena
- Species: P. broadleyi

Binomial name
- Ptychadena broadleyi Stevens, 1972

Species of amphibian

The Broadley's ridged frog (Ptychadena broadleyi) is a species of frog in the family Ptychadenidae. It is endemic to Malawi.

Its natural habitats are subtropical or tropical moist montane forest, moist savanna, and rocky areas. It is threatened by habitat loss.
