= Ptychadena obscura =

Conservation status
- Least Concern (IUCN 3.1)

Scientific classification
- Kingdom: Animalia
- Phylum: Chordata
- Class: Amphibia
- Order: Anura
- Family: Ptychadenidae
- Genus: Ptychadena
- Species: P. obscura

Binomial name
- Ptychadena obscura (Schmidt & Inger, 1959)

Species of frog

Ptychadena obscura is a species of frog in the family Ptychadenidae. It is found in Democratic Republic of the Congo, Zambia, possibly Angola, and possibly Tanzania. Its natural habitats are moist savanna, subtropical or tropical seasonally wet or flooded lowland grassland, swamps, freshwater lakes, and intermittent freshwater marshes.
