= Ptychadena gansi =

Conservation status
- Least Concern (IUCN 3.1)

Scientific classification
- Kingdom: Animalia
- Phylum: Chordata
- Class: Amphibia
- Order: Anura
- Family: Ptychadenidae
- Genus: Ptychadena
- Species: P. gansi

Binomial name
- Ptychadena gansi Laurent, 1965

Species of frog

Ptychadena gansi is a species of frog in the family Ptychadenidae. It is endemic to Somalia.

Its natural habitats are dry savanna, subtropical or tropical dry shrubland, subtropical or tropical dry lowland grassland, freshwater marshes, and intermittent freshwater marshes. It is threatened by habitat loss.
