= Ptychadena harenna =

Conservation status
- Data Deficient (IUCN 3.1)

Scientific classification
- Kingdom: Animalia
- Phylum: Chordata
- Class: Amphibia
- Order: Anura
- Family: Ptychadenidae
- Genus: Ptychadena
- Species: P. harenna

Binomial name
- Ptychadena harenna Largen, 1997

Species of frog

Ptychadena harenna is a species of frog in the family Ptychadenidae. It is endemic to Ethiopia and only known from its type locality at the foothills of the Bale Mountains, in the Bale Mountains National Park. The locality is within the Harenna Forest, and common name Harenna Forest grass frog has been coined for it.

== Description ==
Adult males measure 36–39 mm (1.4–1.5 in) and adult females, based on a single specimen, 45 mm (1.8 in) in snout–vent length. The head is longer than it is broad. The snout is obtusely pointed. The tympanum is conspicuous. The toes have moderate webbing. The dorsum has four pairs of longitudinal dermal folds, of which the outer pair is prominent, whereas the inner ones are less well-defined, partly broken into clusters of large, rounded warts. Dorsal colouration is cream or pale grey-brown to dark olive-brown. The dorsal skin folds, upper flanks, upper surface of forelimbs, outer edge of hind limbs, upper eyelids, and lips have often suffused to a variable degree with pink, reddish, or purplish pigment, There are dark grey to black markings on the back that vary from being almost obsolete to relatively numerous and prominent, at least dorsolaterally.

== Habitat and conservation ==
Ptychadena harenna is known from a Podocarpus forest, found amongst herbaceous vegetation on the forest floor, and from a shallow, stagnant pool without aquatic vegetation, next to a fast-flowing river. These are at 1,550 m (5,090 ft) above sea level.

The type locality is within a national park, affording the species some protection. Outside the area, it would suffer from environmental degradation caused by increasing human settlement, with the consequent exploitation of resources, particularly forests.
