= Mozambique frog =

Mozambique frog may refer to:

- Mozambique rain frog (Breviceps mossambicus), a frog in the family Brevicipitidae found in Africa
- Mozambique ridged frog (Ptychadena mossambica) a frog in the family Ptychadenidae found in Africa
