= Ptychadena keilingi =

Conservation status
- Least Concern (IUCN 3.1)

Scientific classification
- Kingdom: Animalia
- Phylum: Chordata
- Class: Amphibia
- Order: Anura
- Family: Ptychadenidae
- Genus: Ptychadena
- Species: P. keilingi

Binomial name
- Ptychadena keilingi (Monard, 1937)
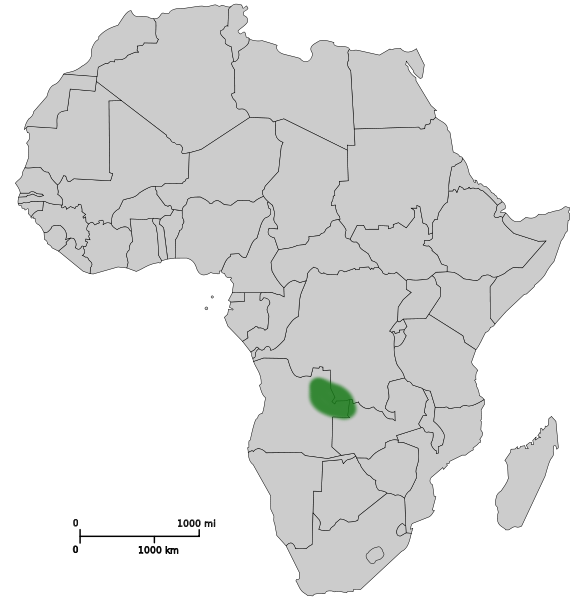
- Ptychadena keilingi distribution

Species of frog

Ptychadena keilingi is a species of frog in the family Ptychadenidae. It is found in Angola, Democratic Republic of the Congo, and Zambia. Its natural habitats are moist savanna, subtropical or tropical seasonally wet or flooded lowland grassland, and swamps.
