= Ptychadena mahnerti =

Conservation status
- Least Concern (IUCN 3.1)

Scientific classification
- Kingdom: Animalia
- Phylum: Chordata
- Class: Amphibia
- Order: Anura
- Family: Ptychadenidae
- Genus: Ptychadena
- Species: P. mahnerti

Binomial name
- Ptychadena mahnerti (Perret, 1996)

Species of frog

Ptychadena mahnerti is a species of frog in the family Ptychadenidae. It is found in Kenya and possibly Uganda. Its natural habitats are subtropical or tropical high-altitude grassland, swamps, freshwater marshes, pastureland, and ponds. It is threatened by habitat loss.

== Etymology ==
The frog is named after Volker Mahnert.
