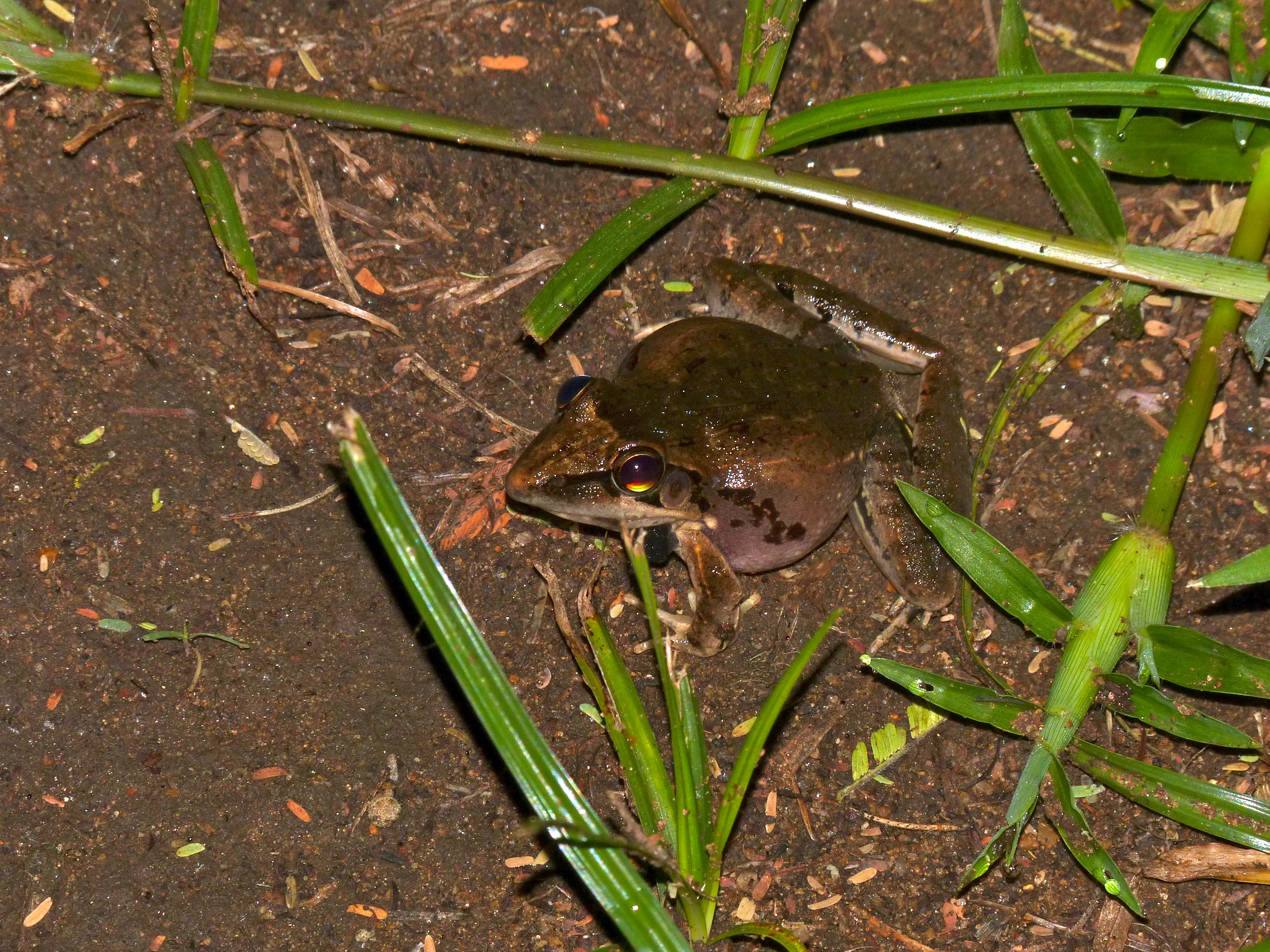

Conservation status
- Least Concern (IUCN 3.1)

Scientific classification
- Kingdom: Animalia
- Phylum: Chordata
- Class: Amphibia
- Order: Anura
- Family: Ptychadenidae
- Genus: Ptychadena
- Species: P. anchietae

Binomial name
- Ptychadena anchietae (Bocage, 1868)

= Anchieta's ridged frog =

Species of frog

Anchieta's ridged frog or plain grass frog (Ptychadena anchietae) is a species of frog in the family Ptychadenidae. It is found in Angola, Botswana, Republic of the Congo, Democratic Republic of the Congo, Djibouti, Eritrea, Eswatini, Ethiopia, Kenya, Malawi, Mozambique, Namibia, Somalia, South Africa, Sudan, Tanzania, Uganda, Zambia, Zimbabwe, possibly Burundi, and possibly Rwanda. Its natural habitats are subtropical or tropical moist lowland forest, subtropical or tropical moist montane forest, dry savanna, moist savanna, subtropical or tropical dry shrubland, subtropical or tropical moist shrubland, subtropical or tropical dry lowland grassland, rivers, intermittent rivers, freshwater lakes, freshwater marshes, intermittent freshwater marshes, hot deserts, arable land, rural gardens, urban areas, and ponds.
