= Ptychadena taenioscelis =

Conservation status
- Least Concern (IUCN 3.1)

Scientific classification
- Kingdom: Animalia
- Phylum: Chordata
- Class: Amphibia
- Order: Anura
- Family: Ptychadenidae
- Genus: Ptychadena
- Species: P. taenioscelis

Binomial name
- Ptychadena taenioscelis Laurent, 1954

Species of frog

Ptychadena taenioscelis is a species of frog in the family Ptychadenidae. It is found in Angola, Botswana, Republic of the Congo, Democratic Republic of the Congo, Gabon, Kenya, Malawi, Mozambique, Namibia, South Africa, Tanzania, Zambia, possibly Burundi, possibly Uganda, and possibly Zimbabwe. Its natural habitats are dry savanna, moist savanna, subtropical or tropical dry shrubland, subtropical or tropical moist shrubland, subtropical or tropical seasonally wet or flooded lowland grassland, swamps, intermittent freshwater marshes, pastureland, and canals and ditches.
