= Ptychadena mapacha =

Conservation status
- Data Deficient (IUCN 3.1)

Scientific classification
- Kingdom: Animalia
- Phylum: Chordata
- Class: Amphibia
- Order: Anura
- Family: Ptychadenidae
- Genus: Ptychadena
- Species: P. mapacha

Binomial name
- Ptychadena mapacha Channing, 1993

Species of frog

Ptychadena mapacha is a species of frog in the family Ptychadenidae. It is found in Namibia, possibly Angola, possibly Botswana, and possibly Zambia. Its natural habitats are dry savanna and intermittent freshwater marshes.
