= Ansorge's ridged frog =

Conservation status
- Least Concern (IUCN 3.1)

Scientific classification
- Kingdom: Animalia
- Phylum: Chordata
- Class: Amphibia
- Order: Anura
- Family: Ptychadenidae
- Genus: Ptychadena
- Species: P. ansorgii

Binomial name
- Ptychadena ansorgii (Boulenger, 1905)

Species of amphibian

The Ansorge's ridged frog (Ptychadena ansorgii) is a species of frog in the family Ptychadenidae. It is found in Angola, Democratic Republic of the Congo, Malawi, Zambia, possibly Mozambique, and possibly Tanzania. Its natural habitats are subtropical or tropical dry forest, subtropical or tropical moist lowland forest, moist savanna, rivers, and swamps.
