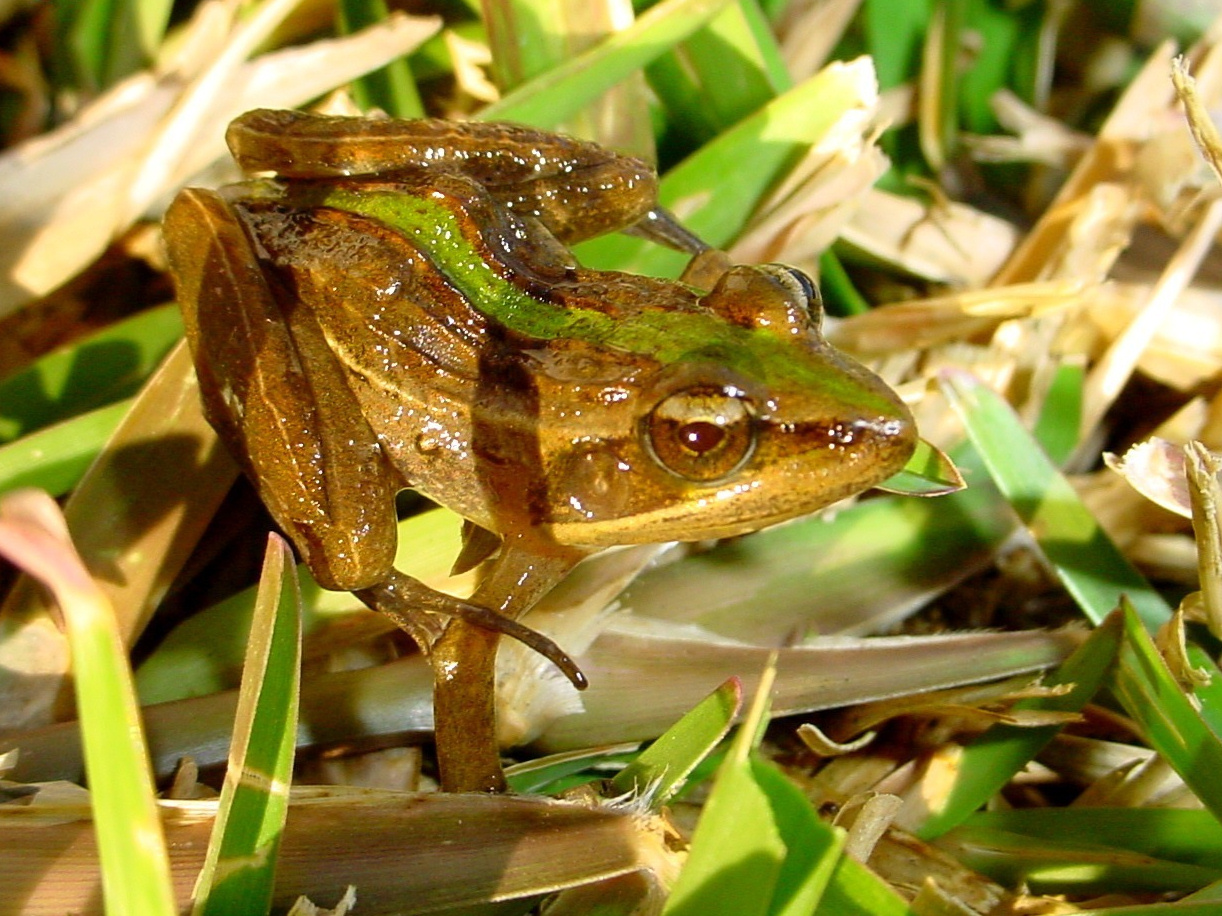
- Ptychadena mascareniensis

Scientific classification
- Kingdom: Animalia
- Phylum: Chordata
- Class: Amphibia
- Order: Anura
- Family: Ptychadenidae
- Genus: Ptychadena; Boulenger, 1917

Type species
- Rana mascareniensis Duméril and Bibron, 1841

= Ptychadena =

Genus of amphibians

Ptychadena is a genus of frogs in the grassland frog family, Ptychadenidae. They are distributed in Sub-Saharan Africa, as well as nilotic Egypt. The common names of this genus are ridged frogs and grass frogs. This type of family have many different characteristics such as the species, Ptychadena neumanni who have long hindlimbs and a large ear drum compared to the Ptychadena erlangeri, for example. They also have a unique bone structure which is a fusion between the presacral vertebrae and sacrum.

== Species ==
The following species are recognised in the genus Ptychadena :

- Ptychadena aequiplicata (Werner, 1898)
- Ptychadena amharensis (Smith, Noonan, and Colston, 2017)
- Ptychadena anchietae (Bocage, 1868)
- Ptychadena ansorgii (Boulenger, 1905)
- Ptychadena arnei (Perret, 1997)
- Ptychadena baroensis (Smith, Noonan, and Colston, 2017)
- Ptychadena beka (Goutte et al, 2021)
- Ptychadena bibroni (Hallowell, 1845)
- Ptychadena boettgeri (Pfeffer, 1893)
- Ptychadena broadleyi Stevens, 1972
- Ptychadena bunoderma (Boulenger, 1907)
- Ptychadena christyi (Boulenger, 1919)
- Ptychadena chrysogaster Laurent, 1954
- Ptychadena cooperi (Parker, 1930)
- Ptychadena doro (Goutte et al, 2021)
- Ptychadena delphina (Goutte et al, 2021)
- Ptychadena erlangeri (Ahl, 1924)
- Ptychadena gansi Laurent In Gans, Laurent & Pandit, 1965
- Ptychadena goweri Smith, Noonan, and Colston, 2017
- Ptychadena grandisonae Laurent, 1954
- Ptychadena guibei Laurent, 1954
- Ptychadena harenna Largen, 1997
- Ptychadena hylaea Schmidt and Inger, 1959
- Ptychadena ingeri Perret, 1991
- Ptychadena keilingi (Monard, 1937)
- Ptychadena levenorum (Smith, Noonan, and Colston, 2017)
- Ptychadena longirostris (Peters, 1870)
- Ptychadena mahnerti Perret, 1996
- Ptychadena mapacha Channing, 1993
- Ptychadena mascareniensis (Duméril & Bibron, 1841)
- Ptychadena mossambica (Peters, 1854)
- Ptychadena mutinondoensis Channing and Willem, 2018
- Ptychadena nana (Perret, 1980)
- Ptychadena neumanni (Ahl, 1924)
- Ptychadena newtoni (Bocage, 1886)
- Ptychadena nilotica (Seetzen, 1855)
- Ptychadena nuerensis Smith, Noonan, and Colston, 2017
- Ptychadena obscura (Schmidt & Inger, 1959)
- Ptychadena oxyrhynchus (Smith, 1849)
- Ptychadena perplicata Laurent, 1964
- Ptychadena perreti Guibé & Lamotte, 1958
- Ptychadena porosissima (Steindachner, 1867)
- Ptychadena pujoli Lamotte & Ohler, 1997
- Ptychadena pumilio (Boulenger, 1920)
- Ptychadena retropunctata (Angel, 1949)
- Ptychadena robeensis (Goutte et al, 2021)
- Ptychadena schillukorum (Werner, 1908)
- Ptychadena stenocephala (Boulenger, 1901)
- Ptychadena straeleni (Inger, 1968)
- Ptychadena submascareniensis (Guibé & Lamotte, 1953)
- Ptychadena subpunctata (Bocage, 1866)
- Ptychadena superciliaris (Günther, 1858)
- Ptychadena taenioscelis Laurent, 1954
- Ptychadena tellinii (Peracca, 1904)
- Ptychadena tournieri (Guibé & Lamotte, 1955)
- Ptychadena trinodis (Boettger, 1881)
- Ptychadena upembae (Schmidt & Inger, 1959)
- Ptychadena uzungwensis (Loveridge, 1932)
- Ptychadena wadei Largen, 2000
