= Ptychadena guibei =

Conservation status
- Least Concern (IUCN 3.1)

Scientific classification
- Kingdom: Animalia
- Phylum: Chordata
- Class: Amphibia
- Order: Anura
- Family: Ptychadenidae
- Genus: Ptychadena
- Species: P. guibei

Binomial name
- Ptychadena guibei Laurent, 1954

Synonyms
- Ptychadena chrysogaster guibei Laurent, 1954; Rana chrysogaster guibei (Laurent, 1954)

Species of frog

Ptychadena guibei is a species of frog in the family Ptychadenidae. It is found in northeastern and eastern Angola, the Caprivi Strip of northeastern Namibia, northern Botswana, northwestern and eastern Zimbabwe, Zambia, southern Democratic Republic of the Congo, Malawi, and northern Mozambique. The specific name guibei honours Jean Guibé, a French zoologist and herpetologist. Common names Guibe's yellow-bellied grass frog, Guibe's grass frog, Guibe's grassland frog, and Guibe's ridge frog have been coined for it.

== Description ==
Adult males from the Upemba National Park measure 36–38 mm (1.4–1.5 in) and adult females 45–47 mm (1.8–1.9 in) in snout–vent length; the maximum sizes in the original species description were 36 and 49 mm (1.4 and 1.9 in) for males and females, respectively. The body and the limbs are moderately slender. The head is pointed with a strongly projecting snout. The tympanum is distinct. The dorsum has three pairs of longitudinal skin folds anteriorly and four to five pairs posteriorly. The finger and toe tips are bluntly rounded. The toes are about two-thirds webbed. The dorsal colouration consists of rows of black, oblong spots and a broad mid-dorsal light band, with a more or less distinct light vertebral line. The tibia have black crossbars. Males have paired vocal sacs and nuptial pads made of cream-colored or dusky velvety c1usters of spinules.

== Habitat and conservation ==
Ptychadena guibei occurs in moist grassland and savanna; it can be common in dambos. It is generally an upland species, although its range extends to the coast in Mozambique. Breeding takes place in shallow temporary pans and pools where males call from concealed positions close to water.

It is a common species that is unlikely to face more than local threats. It is present in the Upemba National Park (Democratic Republic of Congo) and probably in many other protected areas.
