= Ptychadena trinodis =

Conservation status
- Least Concern (IUCN 3.1)

Scientific classification
- Kingdom: Animalia
- Phylum: Chordata
- Class: Amphibia
- Order: Anura
- Family: Ptychadenidae
- Genus: Ptychadena
- Species: P. trinodis

Binomial name
- Ptychadena trinodis (Boettger, 1881)

Synonyms
- Rana trinodis Boettger, 1881

Species of frog

Ptychadena trinodis is a species of frog in the family Ptychadenidae. Its common name is Dakar grassland frog. It is widely distributed in West and Middle Africa, and following the International Union for Conservation of Nature (IUCN), occurs in Benin, Cameroon, Central African Republic, Chad, Democratic Republic of the Congo, Gambia, Ghana, Guinea, Ivory Coast, Mali, Mauritania, Nigeria, Senegal, and Togo. Further, records are missing from Guinea-Bissau, Burkina Faso, Niger, South Sudan, and Sudan, but it is presumed to be present in these countries too.

== Description ==
Ptychadena trinodis is a relatively large frog with a pointed head. Males measure 42–52 mm (1.7–2.0 in) and females 47–57 mm (1.9–2.2 in) in snout–vent length. Males have paired lateral vocal sacs. The tympanum is large and distinct. There are three pairs of continuous dorsal ridges that start at the level of the eyes, and a shorter, median pair. The hind legs are sturdy and of moderate length. The inner metatarsal tubercle is massive, almost as long as the shortest toe. The colouration is generally brownish or grayish, with black or dark brown spots present on dorsal ridges, flanks, and the dorsum.

== Habitat, ecology, and conservation ==
Its natural habitats are both dry and humid savannas, with a preference for the former. Breeding takes place in very small, temporary ponds and seems to commence at once when the rainy season starts and may continue through the rainy season. The eggs hatch to tadpoles in a day and metamorphose in three weeks.

Ptychadena trinodis has a patchy distribution and a low population density. In northern Benin, however, it was found to be common after the first rains of the season. It is an adaptable species that is not facing any significant threats. It also occurs in many protected areas, including the Garamba National Park; the IUCN has assessed Ptychadena trinodis as of "Least Concern".
