= Ptychadena subpunctata =

Conservation status
- Least Concern (IUCN 3.1)

Scientific classification
- Kingdom: Animalia
- Phylum: Chordata
- Class: Amphibia
- Order: Anura
- Family: Ptychadenidae
- Genus: Ptychadena
- Species: P. subpunctata

Binomial name
- Ptychadena subpunctata (Bocage, 1866)

Species of frog

Ptychadena subpunctata is a species of frog in the family Ptychadenidae. It is found in Angola, Botswana, Democratic Republic of the Congo, Namibia, Zambia, and Zimbabwe. Its natural habitats are dry savanna, moist savanna, rivers, swamps, freshwater lakes, and freshwater marshes.
