= Ptychadena arnei =

Conservation status
- Data Deficient (IUCN 3.1)

Scientific classification
- Kingdom: Animalia
- Phylum: Chordata
- Class: Amphibia
- Order: Anura
- Family: Ptychadenidae
- Genus: Ptychadena
- Species: P. arnei

Binomial name
- Ptychadena arnei Perret, 1997
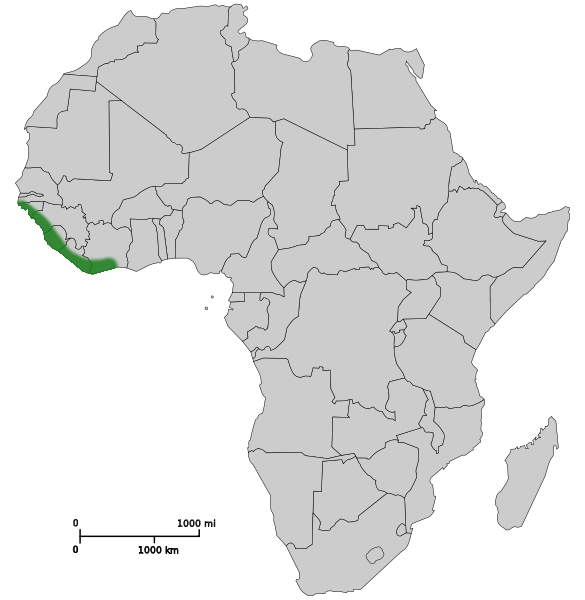
- Ptychadena arnei distribution

Species of frog

Ptychadena arnei is a species of frog in the family Ptychadenidae. It is found in Ivory Coast, Guinea, Senegal, Sierra Leone, possibly Guinea-Bissau, and possibly Liberia. Its natural habitats are subtropical or tropical moist lowland forest, moist savanna, swamps, intermittent freshwater lakes, freshwater marshes, and heavily degraded former forest.
