= Lanzarana =

Conservation status
- Least Concern (IUCN 3.1)

Scientific classification
- Kingdom: Animalia
- Phylum: Chordata
- Class: Amphibia
- Order: Anura
- Family: Ptychadenidae
- Genus: Lanzarana; Clarke, 1982
- Species: L. largeni

Binomial name
- Lanzarana largeni (Lanza, 1978)

Genus of amphibians

Lanzarana is a genus of frogs in the family Ptychadenidae. It is monotypic, being represented by the singles species, Lanzarana largeni, commonly known as Lanza's frog.

Lanzarana largeni is endemic to Somalia.

Lanzarana largeni breed in temporary pools and small reservoirs. Outside the breeding season their habitats are poorly known but probably are dry savanna and semi-arid habitats. There does not appear to be major threats to this species.
