= Daloa Airport =

Airport in Ivory Coast

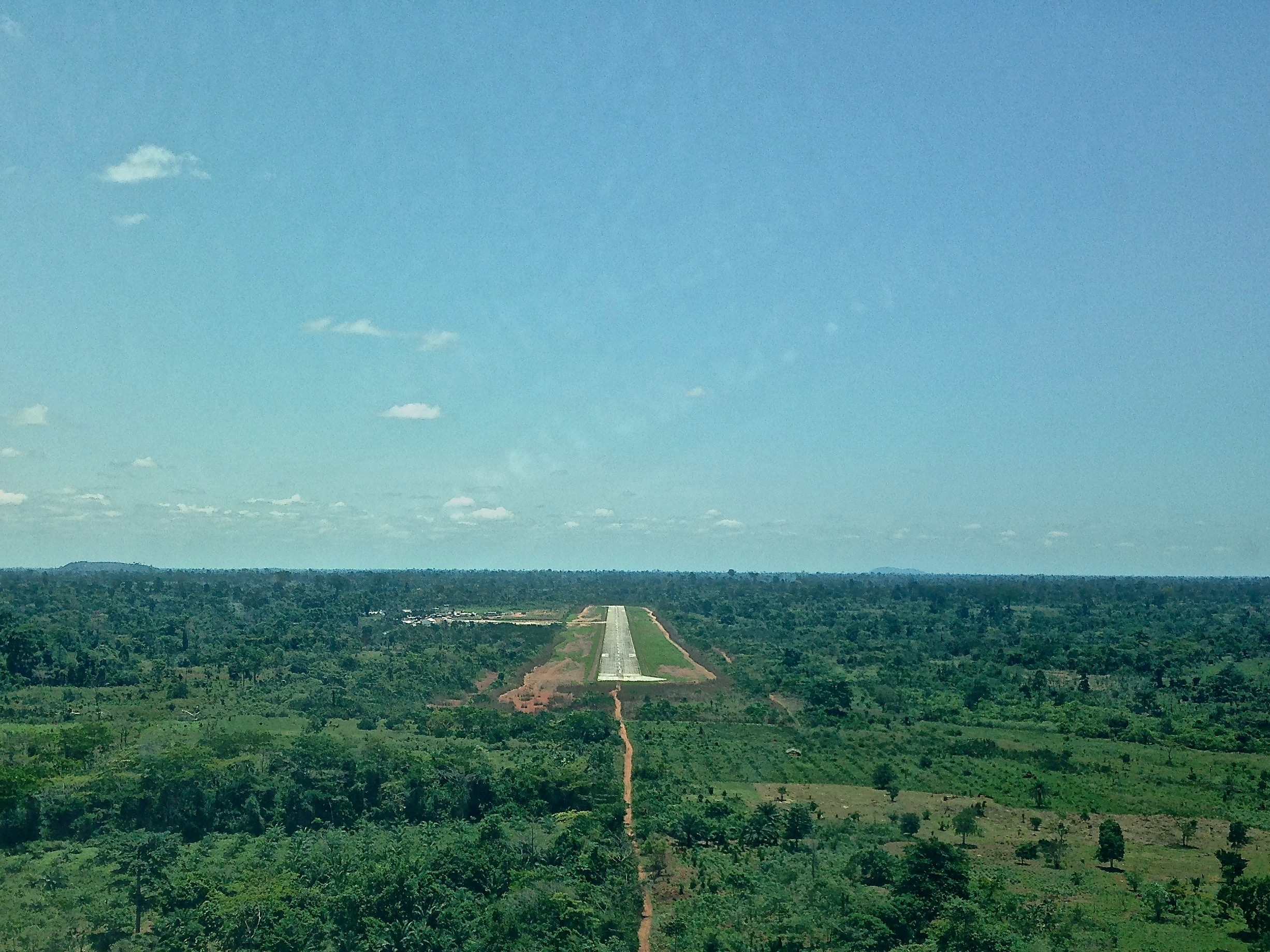
- IATA: DJO; ICAO: DIDL

Summary
- Airport type: Public
- Serves: Daloa
- Elevation AMSL: 141 ft / 43 m
- Coordinates: 6°47′34″N 6°28′24″W

Map

Runways
Direction	Length		Surface
Direction	ft	m	Surface
04/22	6,562	2,000	Asphalt
- Source: Google Maps

Daloa Airport (IATA: DJO, ICAO: DIDL) is an airport serving Daloa, Côte d'Ivoire.

== See also ==
- Transport in Côte d'Ivoire
