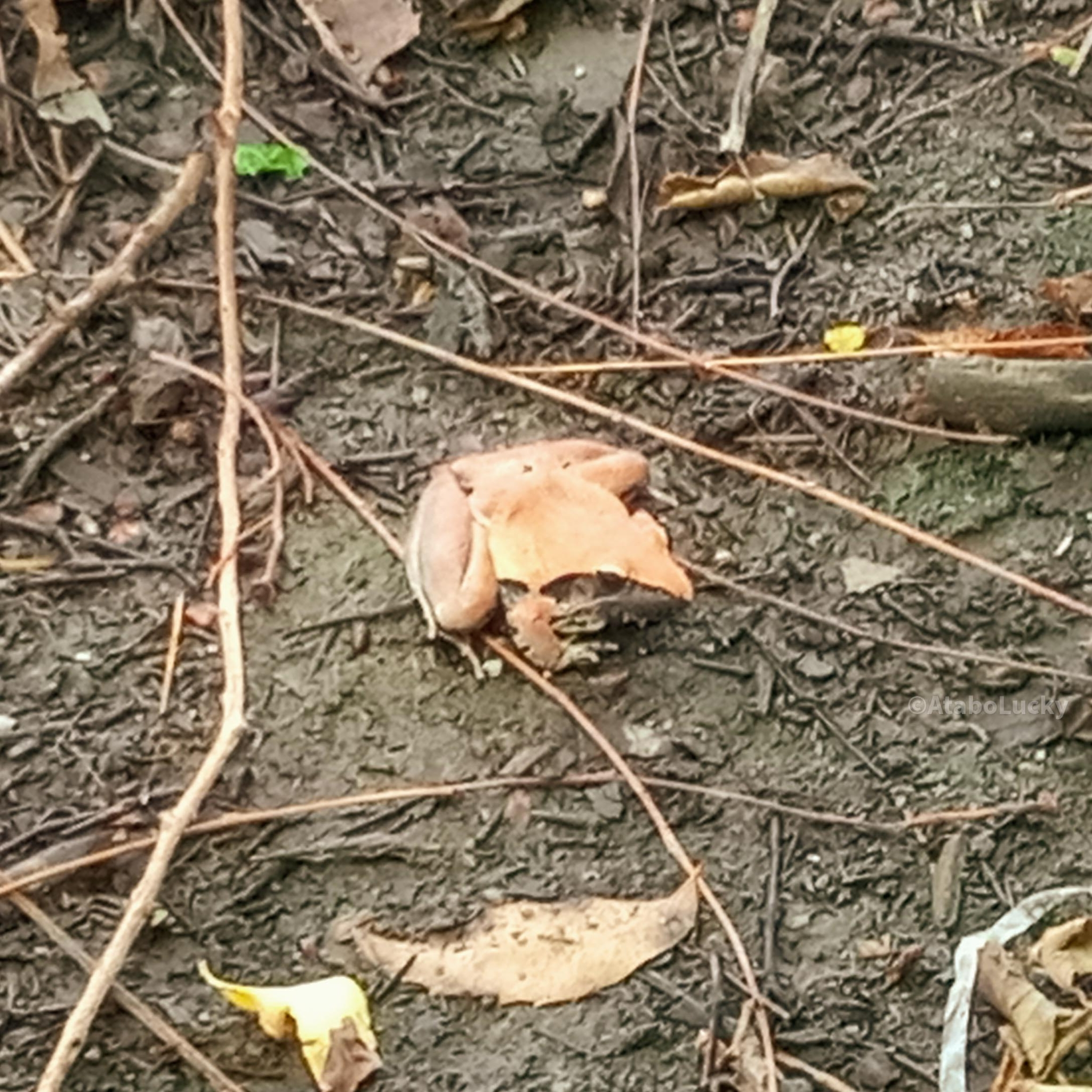

Conservation status
- Least Concern (IUCN 3.1)

Scientific classification
- Kingdom: Animalia
- Phylum: Chordata
- Class: Amphibia
- Order: Anura
- Family: Ptychadenidae
- Genus: Ptychadena
- Species: P. tellinii

Binomial name
- Ptychadena tellinii (Peracca, 1904)

Synonyms
- Phrynobatrachus tellinii Peracca, 1904; Ptychadena schubotzi (Sternfeld, 1917); Rana cornii Scortecci, 1929

= Ptychadena tellinii =

Species of frog

Ptychadena tellinii is a species of frog in the family Ptychadenidae. It is found in Burkina Faso, Cameroon, Central African Republic, Democratic Republic of the Congo, Ivory Coast, Eritrea, Ethiopia, Ghana, Mali, Nigeria, Sierra Leone, Togo, possibly Benin, possibly Chad, possibly Guinea, possibly Liberia, and possibly Sudan.

== Habitat ==
Its natural habitats are subtropical or tropical moist lowland forest, dry savanna, moist savanna, subtropical or tropical dry shrubland, subtropical or tropical moist shrubland, subtropical or tropical dry lowland grassland, rivers, intermittent freshwater marshes, arable land, rural gardens, and ponds. It is threatened by habitat loss.
