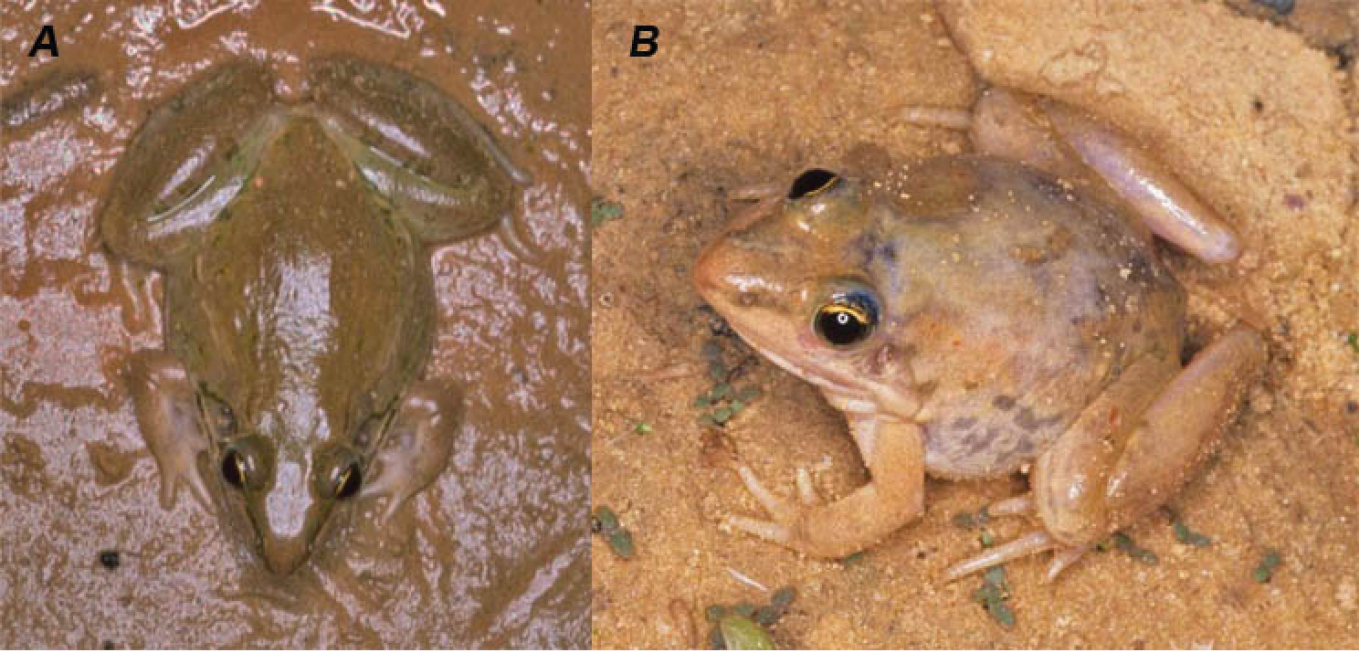

Conservation status
- Least Concern (IUCN 3.1)

Scientific classification
- Kingdom: Animalia
- Phylum: Chordata
- Class: Amphibia
- Order: Anura
- Family: Ptychadenidae
- Genus: Ptychadena
- Species: P. schillukorum

Binomial name
- Ptychadena schillukorum (Werner, 1908)

Synonyms
- Ptychadena cotti (Parker, 1930); Ptychadena floweri (Boulenger, 1917)

= Schilluk ridged frog =

Species of frog

The Schilluk ridged frog (Ptychadena schillukorum) is a species of frog in the family Ptychadenidae. It is found in Angola, Burkina Faso, Cameroon, Democratic Republic of the Congo, Egypt, Eritrea, Ethiopia, Ghana, Kenya, Malawi, Mozambique, Senegal, Somalia, Sudan, and Tanzania. Its natural habitats are dry savanna, moist savanna, subtropical or tropical dry shrubland, subtropical or tropical dry lowland grassland, subtropical or tropical seasonally wet or flooded lowland grassland, rivers, freshwater lakes, freshwater marshes, intermittent freshwater marshes, arable land, ponds, seasonally flooded agricultural land, and canals and ditches.

== Sources ==
- C. Michael Hogan & Jasmine Manalel. 2013. Ptychadena schillukorum. ed. B. Zimkus. African Amphibians Lifedesk
