= Ptychadena stenocephala =

Conservation status
- Least Concern (IUCN 3.1)

Scientific classification
- Kingdom: Animalia
- Phylum: Chordata
- Class: Amphibia
- Order: Anura
- Family: Ptychadenidae
- Genus: Ptychadena
- Species: P. stenocephala

Binomial name
- Ptychadena stenocephala (Boulenger, 1901)

Species of frog

Ptychadena stenocephala is a species of frog in the family Ptychadenidae. It is found in Cameroon, Côte d'Ivoire, Guinea, Uganda, possibly Central African Republic, possibly Liberia, and possibly Nigeria.

Its natural habitats are subtropical or tropical moist lowland forest, moist savanna, subtropical or tropical seasonally wet or flooded lowland grassland, subtropical or tropical high-altitude grassland, swamps, and intermittent freshwater marshes.
