= Ptychadena tournieri =

Conservation status
- Least Concern (IUCN 3.1)

Scientific classification
- Kingdom: Animalia
- Phylum: Chordata
- Class: Amphibia
- Order: Anura
- Family: Ptychadenidae
- Genus: Ptychadena
- Species: P. tournieri

Binomial name
- Ptychadena tournieri (Guibé and Lamotte, 1955)

Synonyms
- Rana (Ptychadena) tournieri Guibé and Lamotte, 1955

Species of frog

Ptychadena tournieri is a species of frog in the family Ptychadenidae. It is a widespread species in West Africa and found in Senegal, Gambia, Guinea-Bissau, Guinea, Sierra Leone, Liberia, and Ivory Coast, as well as in Togo and Benin; it is assumed to occur in Ghana and southeastern Burkina Faso, although it has not been recorded there. On the other hand, some records may refer to other species; the Amphibian Species of the World excludes Gambia and Togo from the distribution. Common names Liberia grassland frog and Tournier's rocket frog are sometimes used.

== Etymology ==
The specific name tournieri refers to Jean-Luc Tournier, who was director of the Institut Français d'Afrique Noire in Abidjan (now Institut Fondamental d'Afrique Noire).

== Description ==
Adult males measure 28–38 mm (1.1–1.5 in) and females 33–48 mm (1.3–1.9 in) in snout–vent length. The webbing in feet leaves one phalanx of toe V free (two in P. pujoli). The head is slightly longer than wide and with a pointed snout. The tympanum is almost as large as the eye. The dorsum has two pairs of dorsal ridges, with granulated skin in between, and a pair of dorsolateral ridges. Fine ridges are present also on the thighs and shanks. The upper lip is white. There are dark canthal lines that run from beyond the tympanum to the flanks, becoming somewhat thinner posteriorly. The dorsal ridges are white to light red whereas the dorsolateral ridges are white.

== Habitat and conservation ==
Ptychadena tournieri inhabits humid savanna areas, and can also survive altered habitats such as rice paddies. Reproduction takes place in small, stagnant and shallow temporary waters as well as in flooded fields and pans. This adaptable species is not considered to face significant threats.
