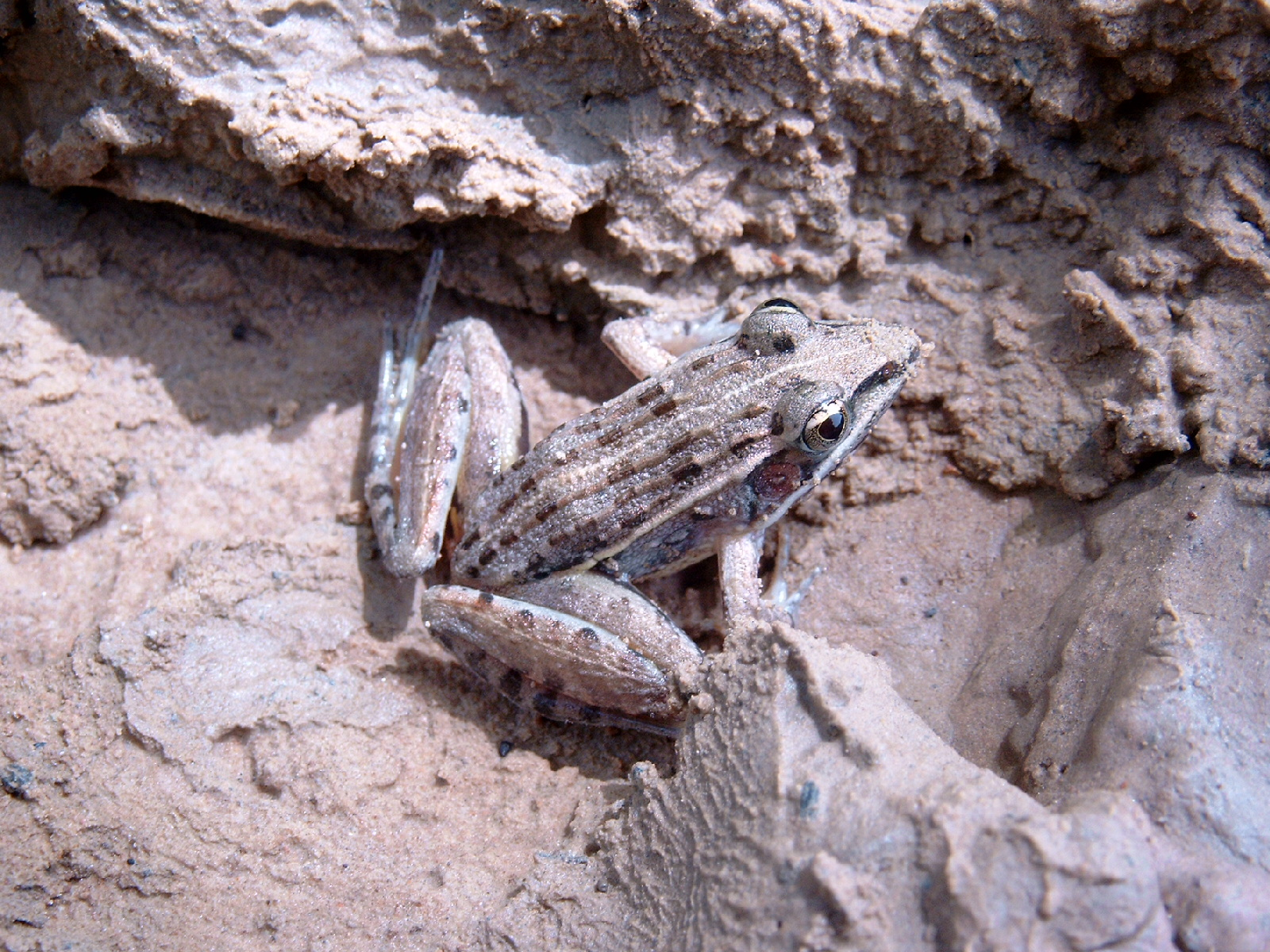

Conservation status
- Least Concern (IUCN 3.1)

Scientific classification
- Kingdom: Animalia
- Phylum: Chordata
- Class: Amphibia
- Order: Anura
- Family: Ptychadenidae
- Genus: Ptychadena
- Species: P. pumilio

Binomial name
- Ptychadena pumilio (Boulenger, 1920)

= Ptychadena pumilio =

Species of frog

Ptychadena pumilio is a species of frog in the family Ptychadenidae. It is found in Benin, Cameroon, Central African Republic, Democratic Republic of the Congo, Ivory Coast, Ethiopia, Mali, Nigeria, Senegal, Sierra Leone, possibly Burkina Faso, possibly Chad, possibly Gambia, possibly Ghana, possibly Guinea, possibly Guinea-Bissau, possibly Liberia, possibly Mauritania, possibly Niger, possibly Sudan, possibly Togo, and possibly Uganda. Its natural habitats are subtropical or tropical moist lowland forest, dry savanna, moist savanna, subtropical or tropical seasonally wet or flooded lowland grassland, subtropical or tropical high-altitude grassland, rivers, freshwater marshes, intermittent freshwater marshes, pastureland, rural gardens, ponds, and canals and ditches.
