= Phrynobatrachus latifrons =

Conservation status
- Least Concern (IUCN 3.1)

Scientific classification
- Kingdom: Animalia
- Phylum: Chordata
- Class: Amphibia
- Order: Anura
- Family: Phrynobatrachidae
- Genus: Phrynobatrachus
- Species: P. latifrons

Binomial name
- Phrynobatrachus latifrons Ahl, 1924

Synonyms
- Hylarthroleptis accraensis Ahl, 1925 "1923"; Phrynobatrachus accraensis (Ahl, 1925); Hylarthroleptis albolabris Ahl, 1925 "1923"; Phrynobatrachus albolabris (Ahl, 1925); Phrynobatrachus vogti Ahl, 1924; Hylarthroleptis vogti (Ahl, 1924); Phrynobatrachus parogoensis Loveridge, 1955

Species of amphibian

Phrynobatrachus latifrons, the Ahl's river frog or savanna puddle frog, (Note: Common names Accra river frog, white-lipped river frog, and Vogt's river frog refer to formerly recognized species now included in Phrynobatrachus latifrons.) is a species of frog in the family Phrynobatrachidae. It is found from Senegal in West Africa east to northern Cameroon and eastern Chad in western Central Africa. The IUCN Red List includes the following West African countries (in alphabetic order): Benin, Burkina Faso, Ivory Coast, Gambia, Ghana, Guinea, Liberia, Mali, Nigeria, Senegal, Sierra Leone, and Togo.

== Etymology ==
The common name of this species refers to its describer, German zoologist Ernst Ahl. The formerly recognized Phrynobatrachus vogti, or Vogt's river frog, is named for Theodor Vogt (1881–1932), a German naturalist.

== Description ==
Phrynobatrachus latifrons are short-lived frogs that reach sexual maturity at the age of 4–5 months and live only for further two months. Their body size is small: males grow to a snout–vent length of 14–20 mm (0.6–0.8 in) and females to 16–23 mm (0.6–0.9 in). They are characterized by moderate webbing in their toes (also considered well-developed), absence of eyelid spine, lack of enlarged discs of finger and toes, and a yellow throat in breeding males.

== Habitat and conservation ==
Phrynobatrachus latifrons is an extremely common species. It inhabits wooded and open savanna, secondary forest, degraded former forest, agricultural areas, and inselbergs in rainforest, but avoids closed primary rainforest. It breeds in temporary ponds, puddles, and roadside ditches. There are no significant threats to this very adaptable species.
