= Hyperolius nitidulus =

Conservation status
- Least Concern (IUCN 3.1)

Scientific classification
- Kingdom: Animalia
- Phylum: Chordata
- Class: Amphibia
- Order: Anura
- Family: Hyperoliidae
- Genus: Hyperolius
- Species: H. nitidulus

Binomial name
- Hyperolius nitidulus Peters, 1875

Species of frog

Hyperolius nitidulus is a species of frog from the family Hyperoliidae. It is found on the West African savannas between Guinea and Mali in the west and Nigeria and Cameroon in the east. Common name plain reed frog has been coined for it.

== Description ==
Hyperolius nitidulus are medium-sized reed frogs with a rather blunt snout. Males vary in size between 23 and 29 mm (0.91 and 1.14 in) and on average weight about one gram. Females are larger and heavier than males, their body size can vary between 24 and 32 mm (0.94 and 1.26 in) with an average weight of about two grams before laying eggs. This species has a large choana, which is not hidden beneath edge of mandible like in most Hyperolius species. They have a relatively large tongue which is broad and shaped like a heart. Their dorsal view is roundish and sometimes a bit pointy. From a lateral view their body is flattened but some have a round truncate. The position of the naris is slightly close to snout tip than to the eye. Skin is laterally smooth and with small warts. Body is slender and half cylindrical with thin limbs. They have extra skin folds that are used to hide their feet while aestivating during dry conditions. Fingers and toes have circummarginal discs. Males have a median subgular vocal sac which is used for calling.

During their juvenile stage their color is beige with a darker lightly flanked stripe at the side from snout to vent. As an adult they exhibit metachrosis (change in color), this color change is based on many factors such temperature, humidity. During the night the uniformly color is beige and during the day the color can vary between yellow and orange with spots. During the dry season the juveniles become white as they aestivate the skin in the inside of their limbs becomes red due to the underlying capillary network.

== Diet ==
Adults are insectivores, usually consuming taxa such as Drosophila, Musca, Phormia, Lucilia, and Calliphora.

== Reproduction ==
Breeding normally occurs during wet season, that is May–October. During mating season males will migrate to temporary ponds and at times stay there and wander between ponds. Males on average stay for several days or even weeks, while females only visit the ponds only for oviposition. While in the ponds males begin calling between dusk and midnight. Males have two distinct calls; one call is used for mating to attract females, and the second call is used as a territorial call. Mating call is fairly short metallic that can last from 0.16 to 0.24 seconds with an average frequency of 2.04–3.43 Kilohertz; the frequency varies depending on the size of the frog. Territorial call sounds like a "croak"; it is deeper than the mating call and lasts for a longer period of time. On average each calls can last from 0.28 to 0.36 seconds with a frequency of 0.98–2.0 Kilohertz. Males tend to become aggressive when defending their small calling territories.

The female deposits her eggs in the water, attaching the clutch underwater where there is vegetation at the bottom of the pond. Females have the ability to lay 94–800 eggs per clutch. Females are able to produce several clutches during one mating season. Nonetheless, clutch size will decrease when multiple clutches are laid. There is no parental care. Eggs are white with a dark brown animal pole.

Two to fives days after the egg were laid the embryos start to hatch as are free-swimming tadpoles. The tadpole development may take longer because it is dependent on water temperature. Free-living larvae stay in the vegetation areas at the edge of the pond and feed of algae. During this period the larvae are at high risk of many predators such as dragonfly and beetle larvae, turtles, and most fish. The tadpole stage lasts six to eight weeks, before the tadpoles metamorphose. For the frog to mature completely it requires about two months.

== Habitat ==
Hyperolius nitidulus inhabit margins of swamps, rivers and lakes in savanna, grassland and bushland habitats. It is a very adaptable species that also occurs in many human-modified areas, such as cultivated land, towns, and gardens.

== Survival during dry season ==
Hyperolius nitidulus live in an environment with a wet season that can be cold and humid, and an extremely hot and dry season. During the hot and dry season the frog is dependent on water therefore it has special adaptations to survive the extreme climate. Hyperolius nitidulus is known for its unique aestivation behavior during the hot and dry season. During dry season Hyperolius nitidulus do not seek shelter or hide, instead, they fully expose themselves to the sun by sitting on dry plants to reduce rapid water loss and can remain in this sitting position for months without food or water. The juveniles only move when they are in serious danger. They sit with their legs held tightly to the body and feet hidden under their skin folds. During this period, since there is no food or water intake, the juvenile frog does not urinate or defecate. The body stores all nitrogenous waste as urea in body fluids and purines. As the hot weather increases the dorsal skin of the frog becomes white due to the presence iridophores that can reflect light like a mirror since they are filled with purines crystals.

Juveniles are the only ones that survive a dry season because most adults cannot adapt to the changes in living condition and die. Juveniles born in the first 2/3 of the wet season have enough time to mature and reproduce in the same season. These juveniles must mature quickly and use all their energy for growth and reproduction, which prevents them from preparing for the dry season that lies ahead; they will die when dry season begins due to the lack of energy. Juveniles that are born in the last third of the wet season take their time maturing and prepare themselves for the dry season. These last juveniles do not reproduce, instead, they allocate all their resources to energy storage to be able to survive the dry season and hope to reproduce the following wet season.
