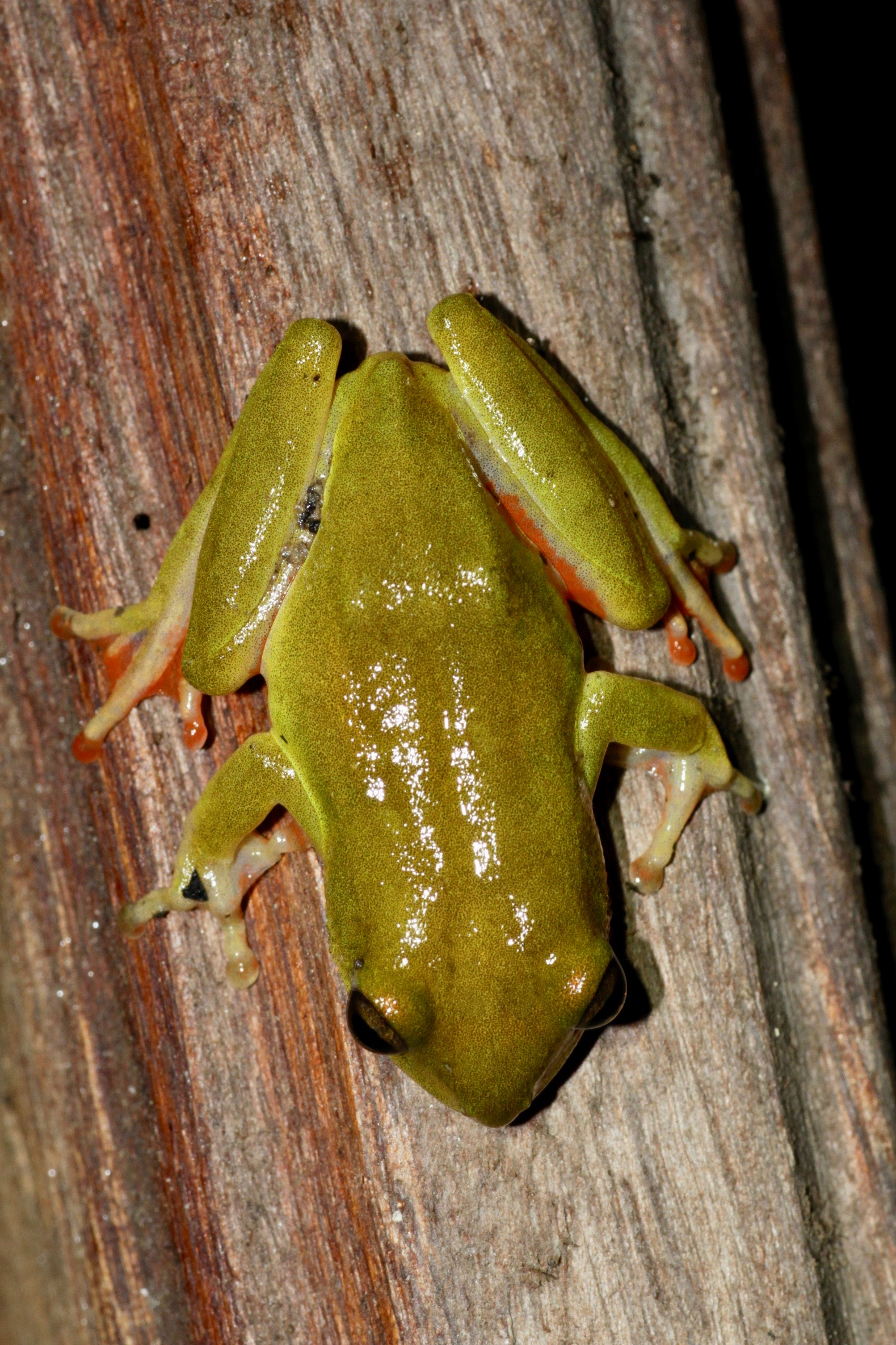

Conservation status
- Least Concern (IUCN 3.1)

Scientific classification
- Kingdom: Animalia
- Phylum: Chordata
- Class: Amphibia
- Order: Anura
- Family: Hyperoliidae
- Genus: Hyperolius
- Species: H. concolor

Binomial name
- Hyperolius concolor (Hallowell, 1844)

Synonyms
- Ixalus concolor Hallowell, 1844

= Hyperolius concolor =

Species of amphibian

Hyperolius concolor, also known as the variable reed frog or Hallowell's sedge frog, is a species of frog in the family Hyperoliidae. It occurs in West and Middle Africa.

== Distribution ==
Hyperolius concolor is known from eastern Sierra Leone, Guinea, Liberia, Ivory Coast, Ghana, Togo, Benin, Nigeria, and western Cameroon (here listed from west to east).

== Taxonomy ==
Hyperolius concolor was described in 1884 by Edward Hallowell based on material collected from Liberia. A large number of species described in later years have been brought into synonymy with it. One subspecies, Hyperolius concolor ibadanensis Schiøtz, 1967 from Nigeria and Cameroon, is recognized, in addition to the nominotypical subspecies and one unnamed subspecies, the latter also from Nigeria and Cameroon.

== Description ==
Hyperolius concolor is a medium to large-sized member of its genus, with males measuring 24–31 mm (0.94–1.22 in) and females about 30–40 mm (1.2–1.6 in) in snout–vent length. The snout is long and pointed. The pupil is horizontal. There are two colour phases. All juveniles and many mature males display phase "J", which is normally brownish to green in colour and shows paired light dorsolateral lines or an hourglass pattern. All females, and some males, develop into phase "F" prior to the first breeding season. This phase is often colourful and variable, with uniformly green dorsum, yellow ventrum, and no dark lateral pigmentation. Also intermediate forms are found.

Male advertisement call is a succession of brief, hard and non-melodic "clicks".

== Habitat and conservation ==
Hyperolius concolor occurs in forest clearings and degraded forest, and in cultivated land, secondary brush, and gallery forests in savanna; it avoids closed forest habitats. Breeding takes place in small (even putrid) pools and marshes. The eggs are laid on folded leaves above water; the tadpoles fall into the water and continue their development there.

It is an abundant species that is probably increasing because its habitat is increasing, even though it could locally suffer from habitat loss. It is sometimes found in the international pet trade, but not at levels that would pose a threat. It occurs in many protected areas.
