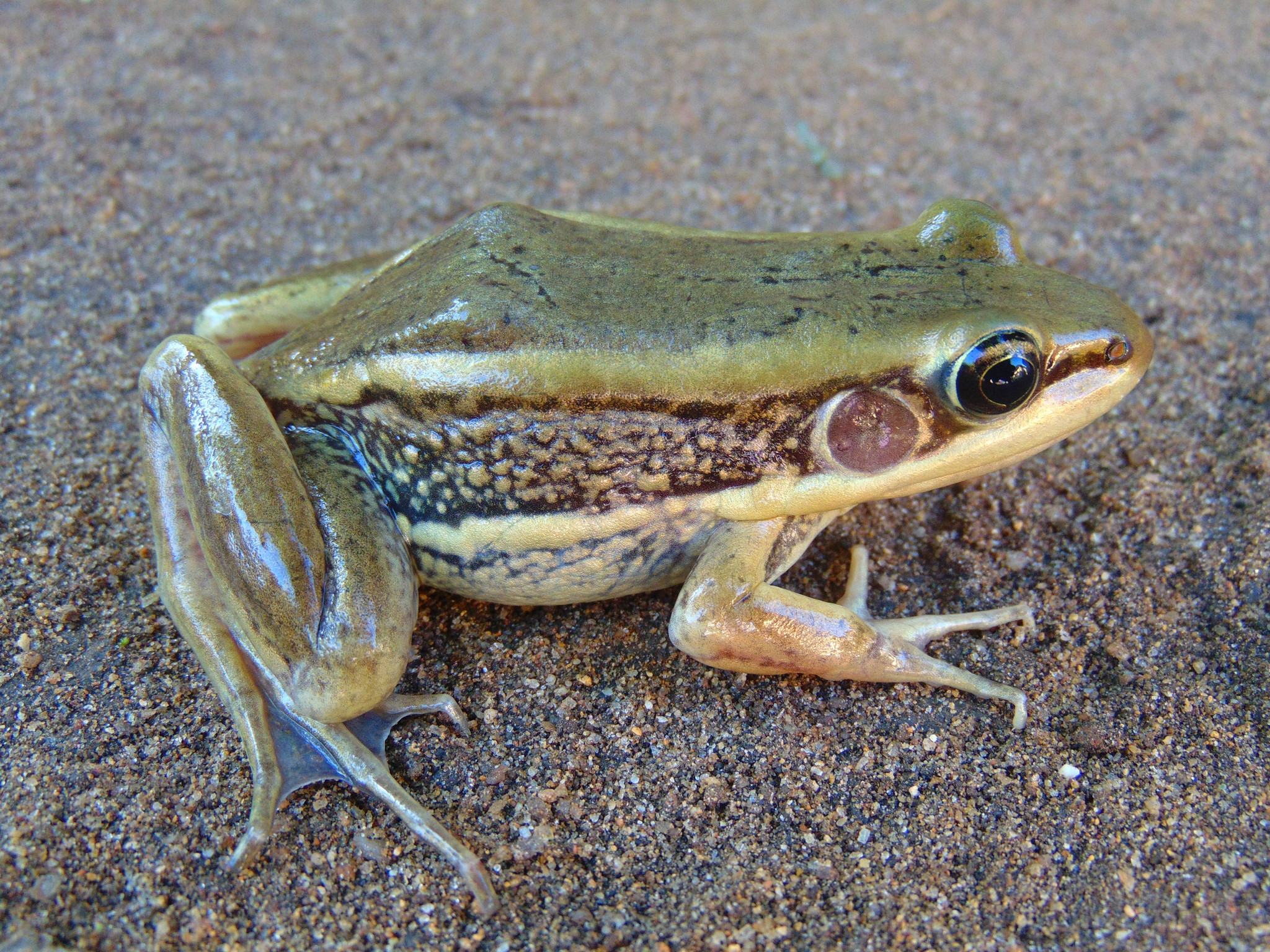

Conservation status
- Least Concern (IUCN 3.1)

Scientific classification
- Kingdom: Animalia
- Phylum: Chordata
- Class: Amphibia
- Order: Anura
- Family: Ranidae
- Genus: Amnirana
- Species: A. galamensis

Binomial name
- Amnirana galamensis (Dumeril & Bibron, 1841)

Synonyms
- Hylarana galamensis (Dumeril & Bibron, 1841)

= Amnirana galamensis =

Species of amphibian

Amnirana galamensis is a species of frog in the family Ranidae. It is found in western, central, and eastern Africa. Its natural habitats are dry savanna, moist savanna, subtropical or tropical moist shrubland, rivers, shrub-dominated wetlands, swamps, freshwater lakes, intermittent freshwater lakes, freshwater marshes, intermittent freshwater marshes, rural gardens, urban areas, water storage areas, ponds, canals and ditches.
