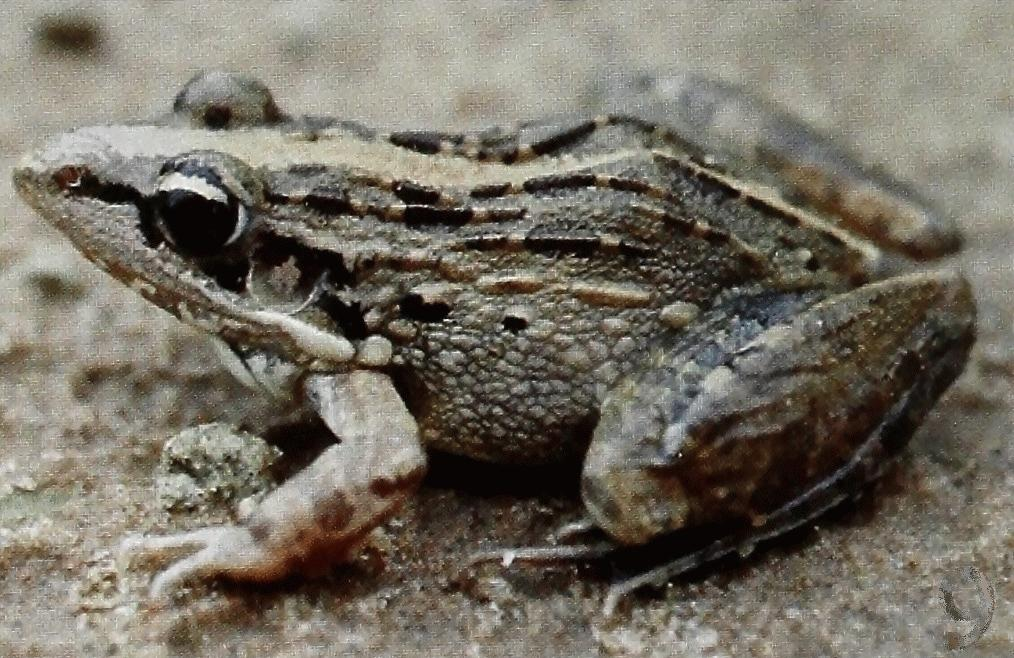

Conservation status
- Least Concern (IUCN 3.1)

Scientific classification
- Kingdom: Animalia
- Phylum: Chordata
- Class: Amphibia
- Order: Anura
- Family: Ptychadenidae
- Genus: Ptychadena
- Species: P. bibroni

Binomial name
- Ptychadena bibroni (Hallowell, 1845)

Synonyms
- Ptychadena maccarthyensis (Andersson, 1937)

= Ptychadena bibroni =

Species of frog

Ptychadena bibroni (commonly known as the broad-banded grassland frog) is a species of frog in the family Ptychadenidae. It is found in Burkina Faso, Cameroon, Central African Republic, Chad, Democratic Republic of the Congo, Ivory Coast, Gambia, Ghana, Guinea, Liberia, Mali, Nigeria, Senegal, Sierra Leone, Togo, possibly Benin, possibly Guinea-Bissau, and possibly Sudan. Its natural habitats are dry savanna, moist savanna, intermittent freshwater marshes, rural gardens, heavily degraded former forest, and canals and ditches.
