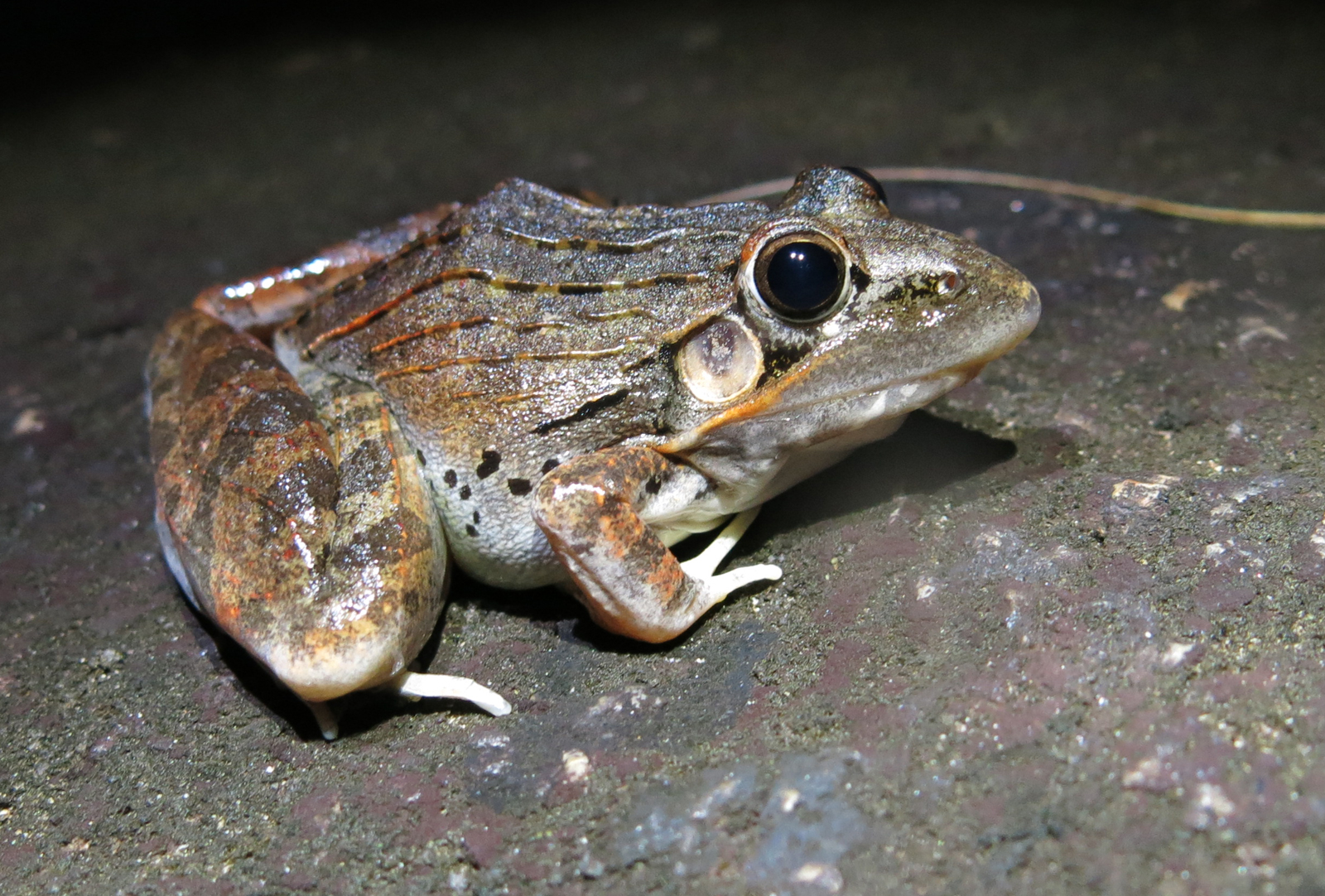

Conservation status
- Least Concern (IUCN 3.1)

Scientific classification
- Kingdom: Animalia
- Phylum: Chordata
- Class: Amphibia
- Order: Anura
- Family: Ptychadenidae
- Genus: Ptychadena
- Species: P. oxyrhynchus

Binomial name
- Ptychadena oxyrhynchus (Smith, 1849)

= Ptychadena oxyrhynchus =

Species of frog

Ptychadena oxyrhynchus, commonly known as the South African sharp-nosed frog, is a species of frog in the family Ptychadenidae. It is found in Angola, Benin, Botswana, Cameroon, Central African Republic, Chad, Republic of the Congo, Democratic Republic of the Congo, Ivory Coast, Gambia, Ghana, Guinea, Guinea-Bissau, Kenya, Malawi, Mali, Mozambique, Namibia, Nigeria, Senegal, South Africa, Swaziland, Tanzania, Togo, Uganda, Zambia, Zimbabwe, possibly Burkina Faso, possibly Burundi, possibly Niger, possibly Rwanda, and possibly Sudan.

Its natural habitats are subtropical or tropical dry forest, dry savanna, moist savanna, subtropical or tropical moist shrubland, swamps, intermittent freshwater marshes, arable land, pastureland, rural gardens, heavily degraded former forest, and canals and ditches.
