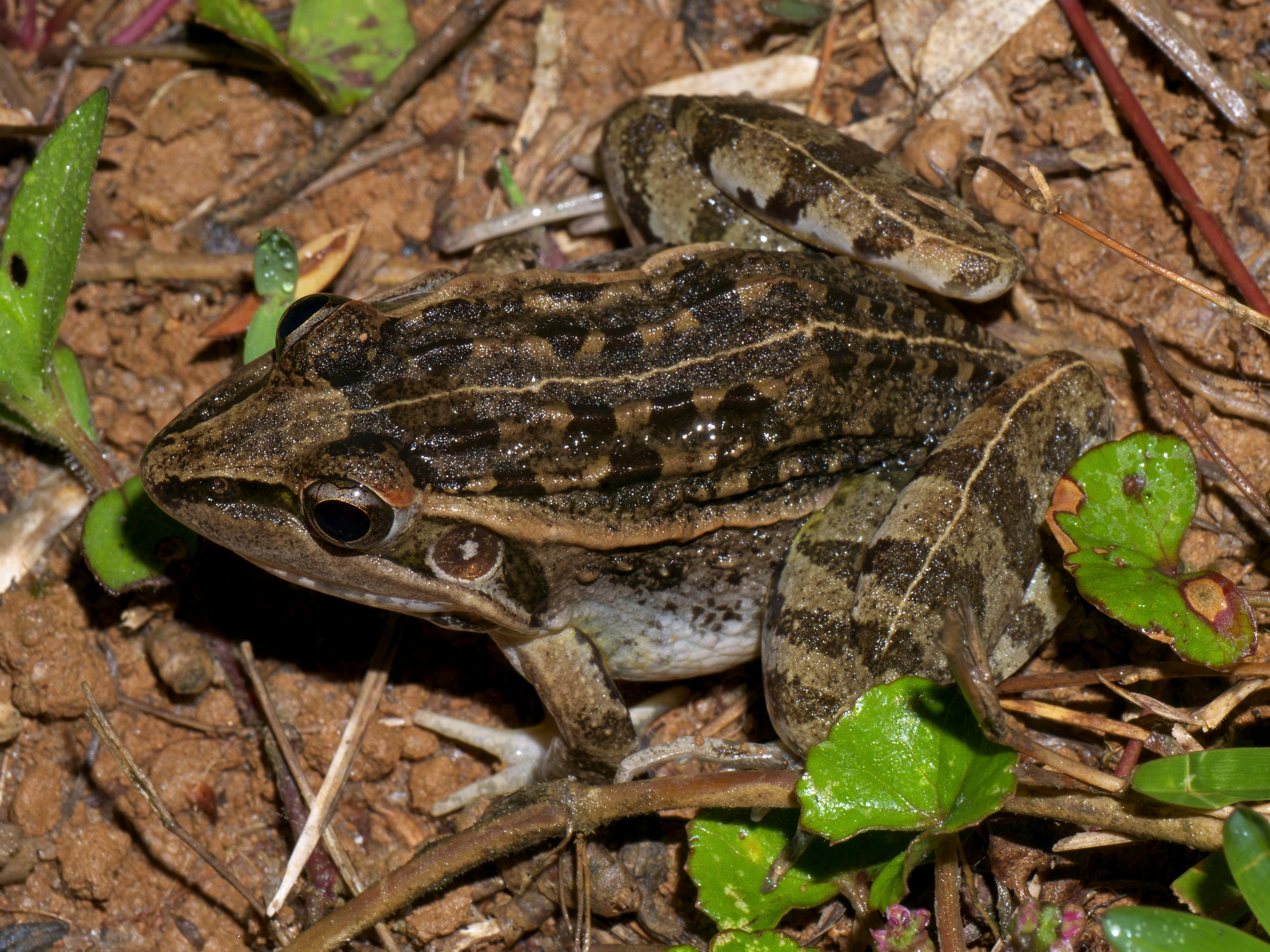
- Andasibe, Moramanga
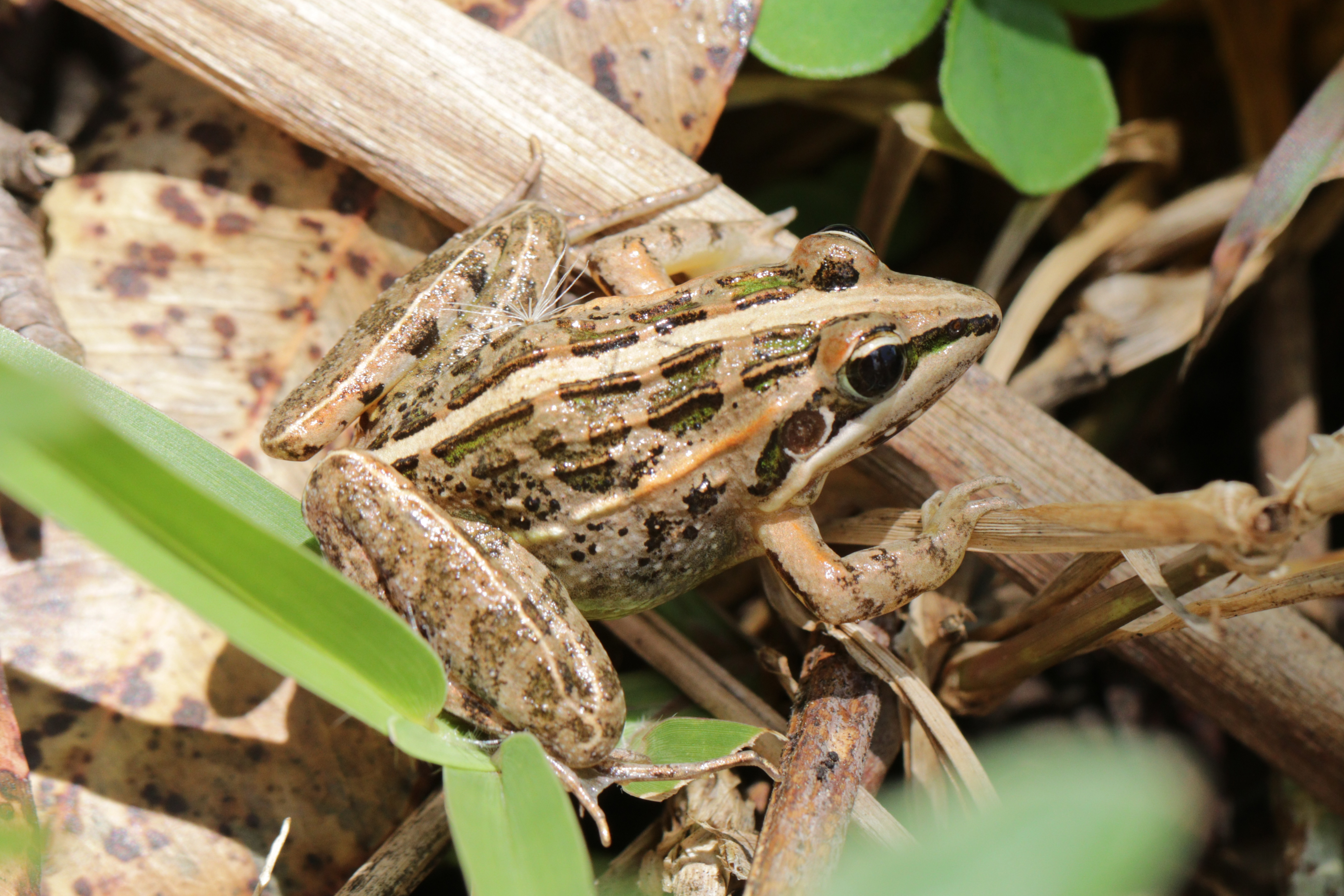
- Ranomafana National Park

Conservation status
- Least Concern (IUCN 3.1)

Scientific classification
- Kingdom: Animalia
- Phylum: Chordata
- Class: Amphibia
- Order: Anura
- Family: Ptychadenidae
- Genus: Ptychadena
- Species: P. mascareniensis

Binomial name
- Ptychadena mascareniensis (Dumeril & Bibron, 1841)
- Mascarene grass frog distribution

Synonyms
- Ptychadena hylaea Schmidt & Inger, 1959

= Mascarene grass frog =

Species of frog

The Mascarene grass frog (Ptychadena mascareniensis), or Mascarene ridged frog, is a species of frog in the family Ptychadenidae. It is found in sub-Saharan Africa, Madagascar, and Mauritius.

Its natural habitats are subtropical or tropical dry forest, subtropical or tropical moist lowland forest, subtropical or tropical swamps, subtropical or tropical moist montane forest, dry savanna, moist savanna, subtropical or tropical dry shrubland, subtropical or tropical moist shrubland, Mediterranean-type shrubby vegetation, subtropical or tropical dry lowland grassland, subtropical or tropical seasonally wet or flooded lowland grassland, subtropical or tropical high-altitude grassland, rivers, intermittent rivers, shrub-dominated wetlands, swamps, freshwater lakes, intermittent freshwater lakes, freshwater marshes, intermittent freshwater marshes, sandy shores, arable land, pastureland, plantations, rural gardens, urban areas, heavily degraded former forest, water storage areas, ponds, aquaculture ponds, irrigated land, seasonally flooded agricultural land, and canals and ditches.

== Phylogeography and history ==
Ptychadena mascareniensis is the only African amphibian species thought to occur on Madagascar and the Mascarene islands.

Madagascar was populated by Ptychadena frogs before the arrival of humans 2000 years ago.
