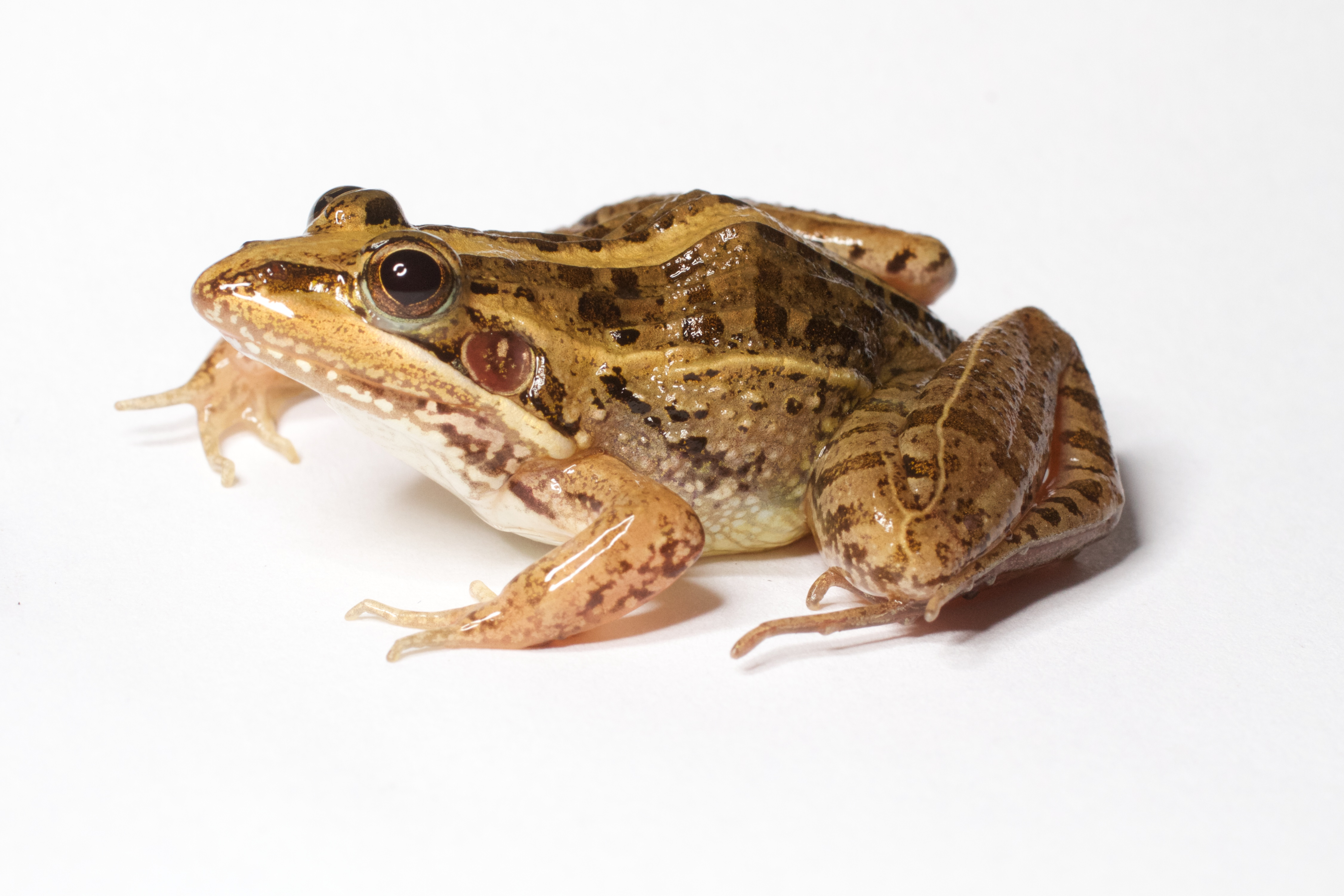
- Ptychadena mascareniensis

Scientific classification
- Kingdom: Animalia
- Phylum: Chordata
- Class: Amphibia
- Order: Anura
- Superfamily: Ranoidea
- Family: Ptychadenidae; Dubois, 1987

Genera
- Hildebrandtia; Lanzarana; Ptychadena

= Ptychadenidae =

Family of amphibians in Sub-Saharan Africa

Ptychadenidae is a family of frogs commonly known as the grassland frogs. These frogs occur in Sub-Saharan Africa.

Ptychadenidae was previously considered to be a tribe or subfamily in the family Ranidae, but its position as a separate family is now well established.

== Subfamilies and genera ==
There are three genera with a total 60 species:

- Hildebrandtia Nieden, 1907 — 3 species
- Lanzarana Clarke, 1982 — 1 species
- Ptychadena Boulenger, 1917 — 59 species
