= List of fauna of Sudan and South Sudan =

Following are examples of the fauna found in Sudan and South Sudan, listed by common names.

- Aardvark
- Aardwolf
- Adanson’s house jumper
- African brush-tailed porcupine
- African buffalo
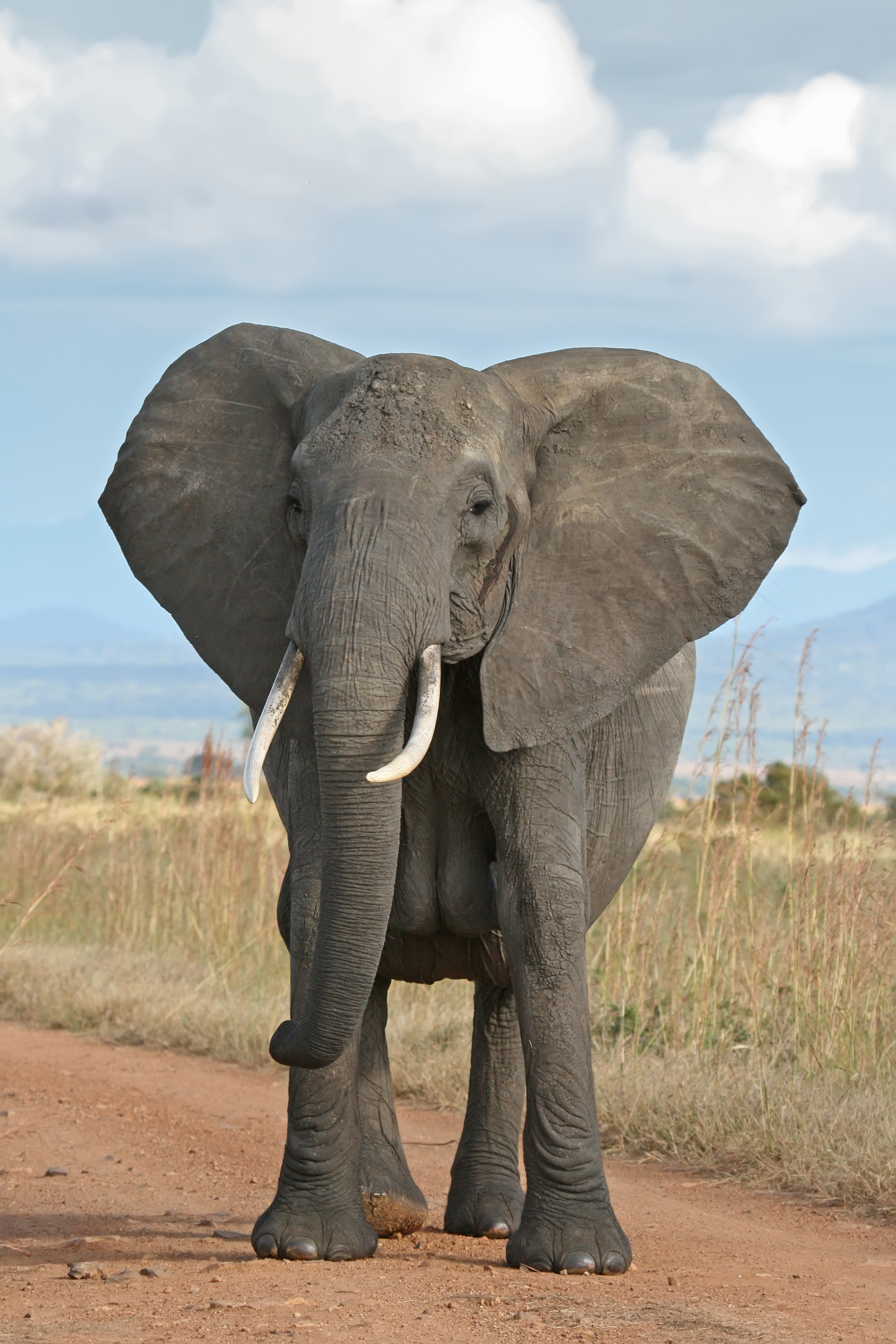
- African bush elephant
  African bush elephant
- African butter catfish
- African civet
- African clawed frog
- African common toad
- African fish eagle
- African golden wolf
- African grey parrot
- African rock python
- African skimmer
- African spurred tortoise
- African wild dog
- African wildcat
- Agag gerbil
- Agama
- Banded garden spider
- Ball python
- Banded mongoose
- Barbary sheep
- Basra reed warbler
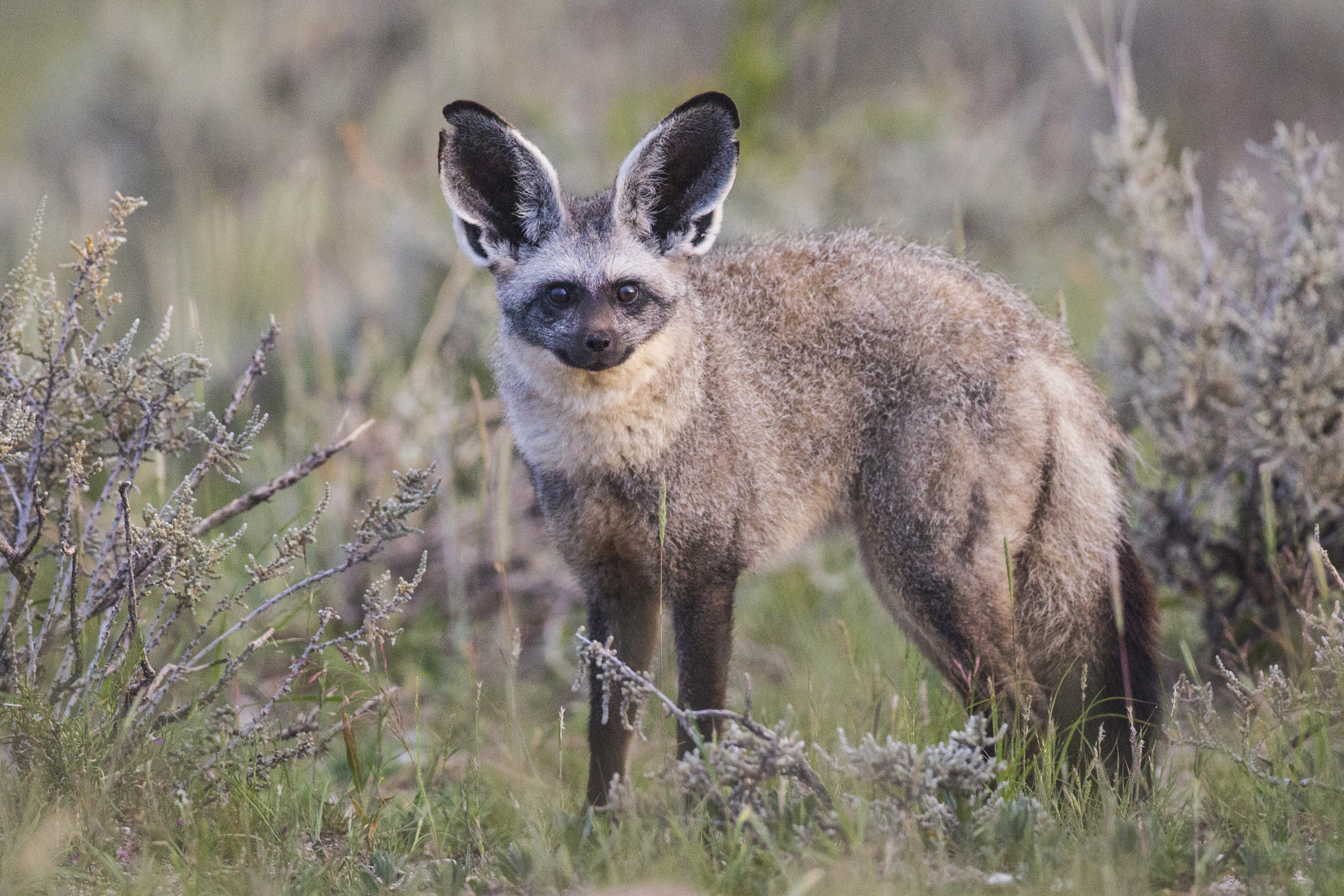
- Bat-eared fox
  Bat-eared fox
- Bateleur
- Bayad
- Black-backed jackal
- Black coucal
- Black fly
- Black kite
- Black mamba
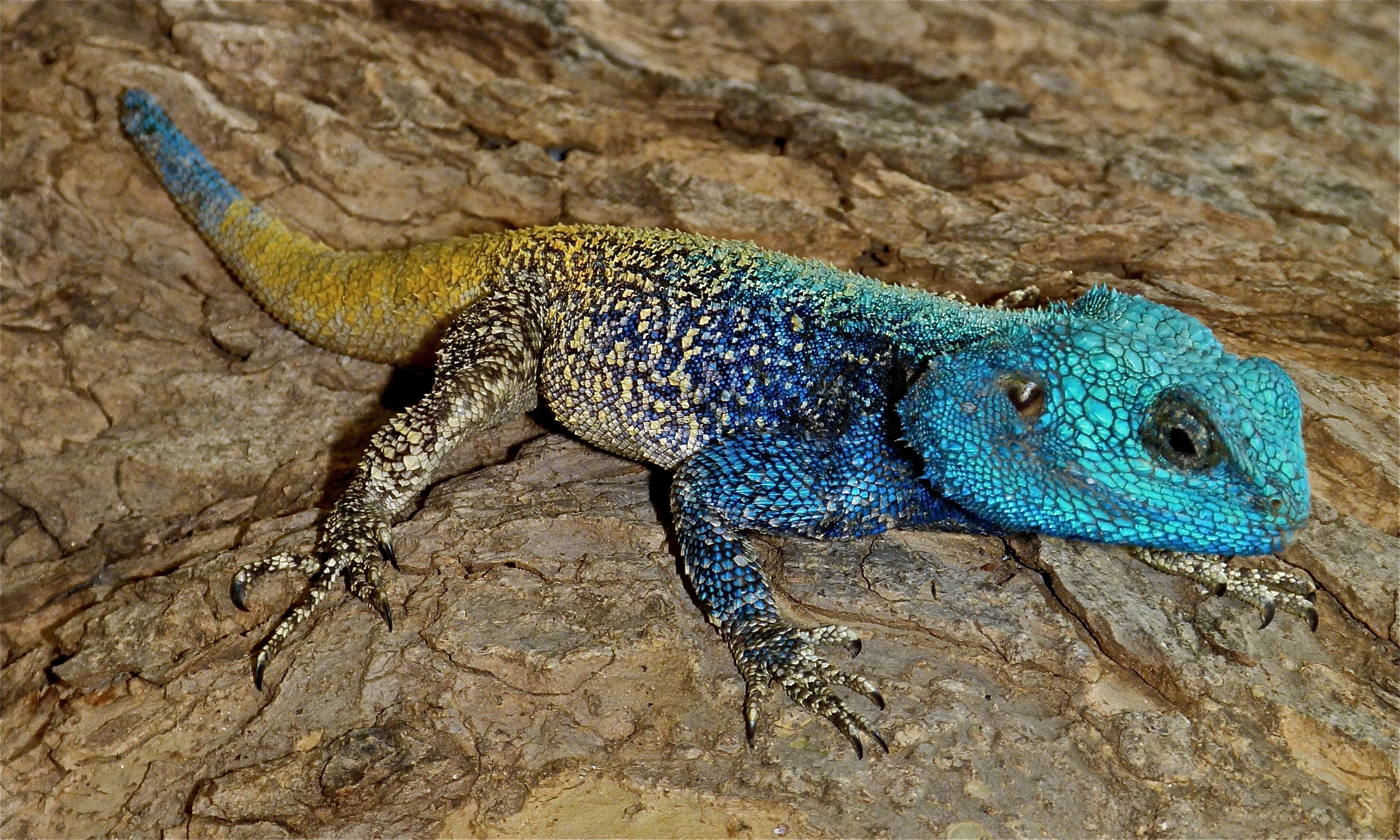
- Black-necked agama
  Black-necked agama
- Black-necked spitting cobra
- Black-winged pratincole
- Blue duiker
- Blue monkey
- Bohor reedbuck
- Bongo
- Boomslang
- Brown widow
- Bruce's green pigeon
- Bushbuck
- Bushpig
- Bustard
- Cape clawless otter
- Caracal
- Camel spiders
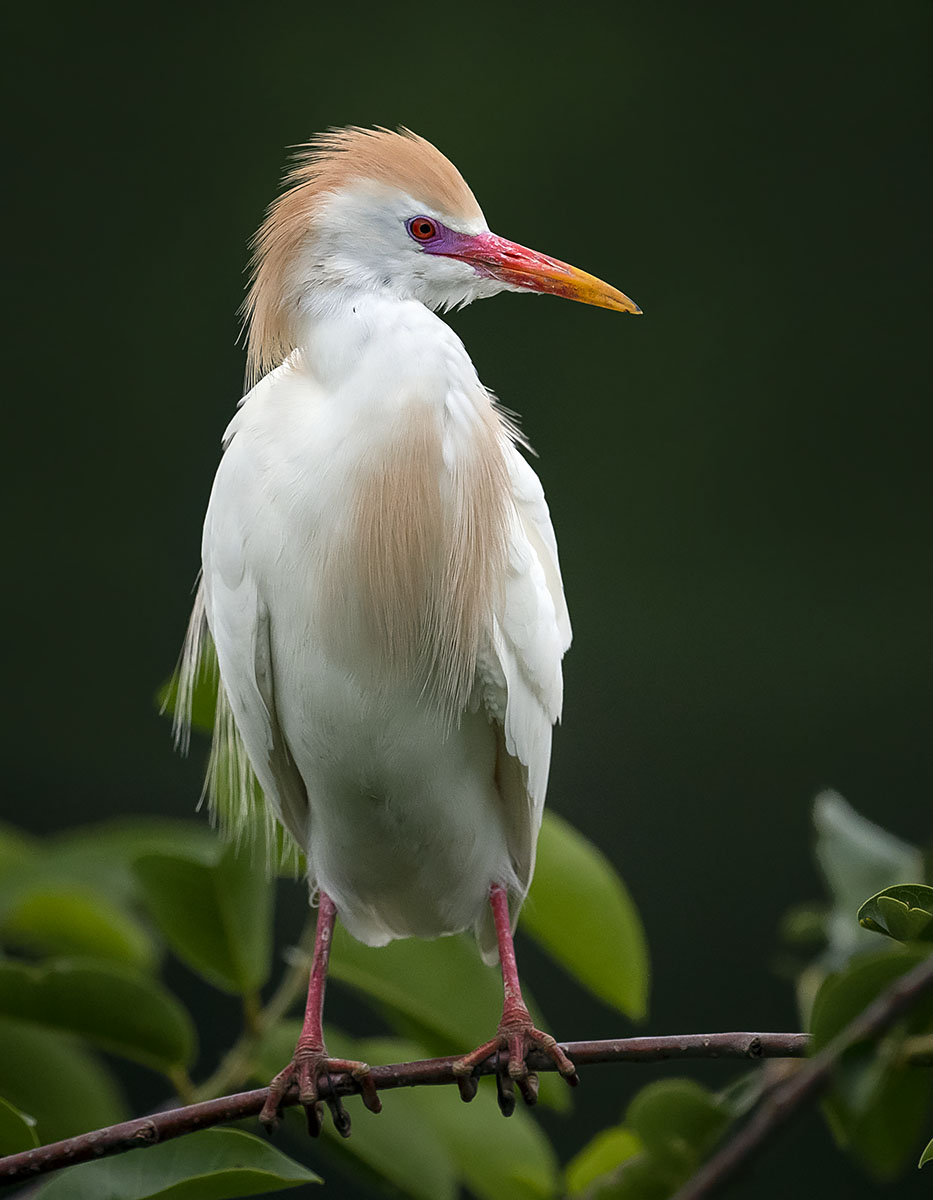
- Cattle egret
  Cattle egret
- Cellar spiders
- Cheetah
- Chimpanzee
- Common duiker
- Common genet
- Common sand frog
- Crab spiders
- Crested porcupine
- Crowned bullfrog
- Crowned hawk eagle
- De Brazza's monkey
- Denham's bustard
- Dorcas gazelle
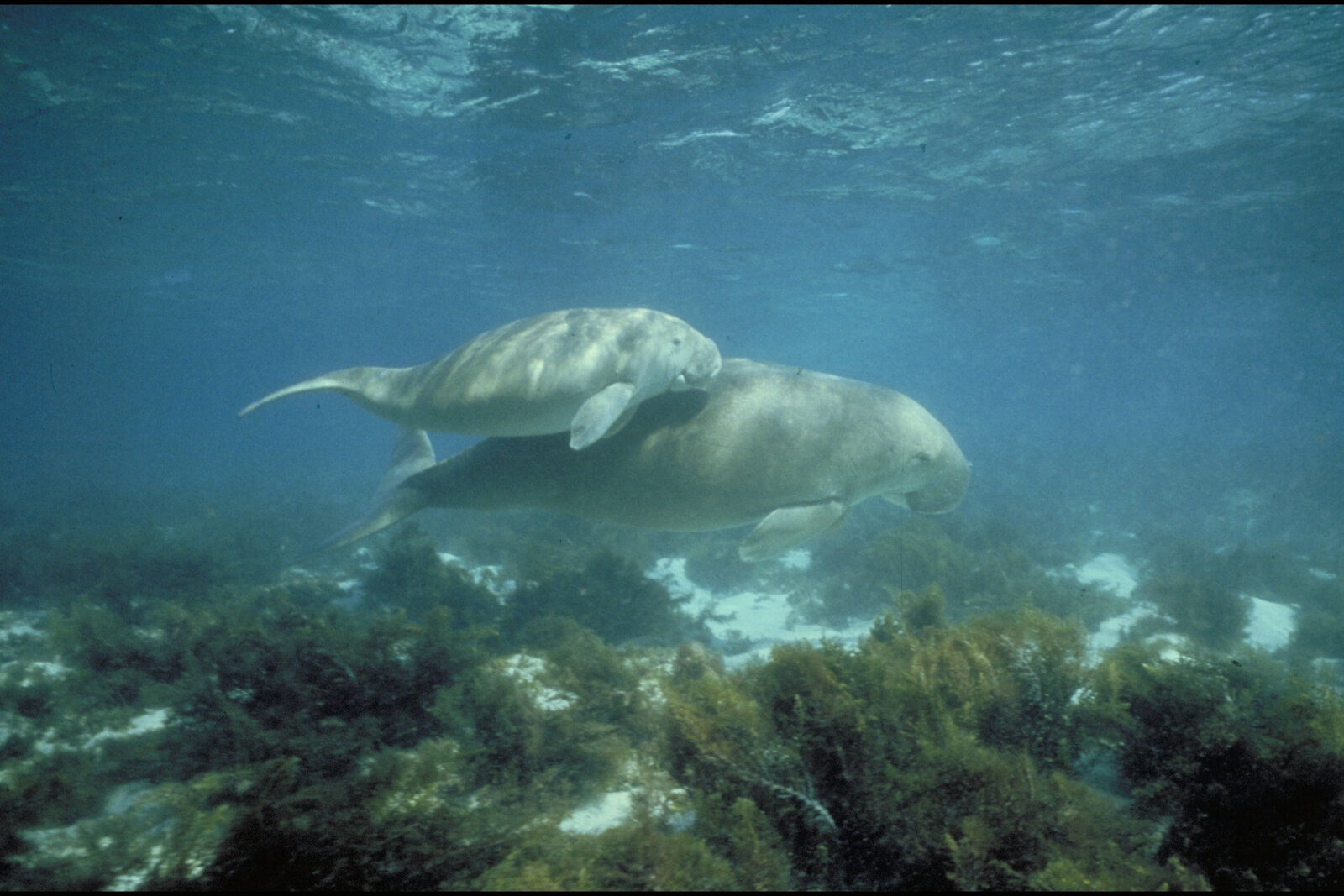
- Dugong
  Dugong
- Dwarf mongoose
- East African oryx
- East African yellow bat
- Eastern plantain-eater
- Egyptian cobra
- Egyptian tomb bat
- Emerald-spotted wood dove
- Ferruginous duck
- Flap-necked chameleon
- Forest cobra
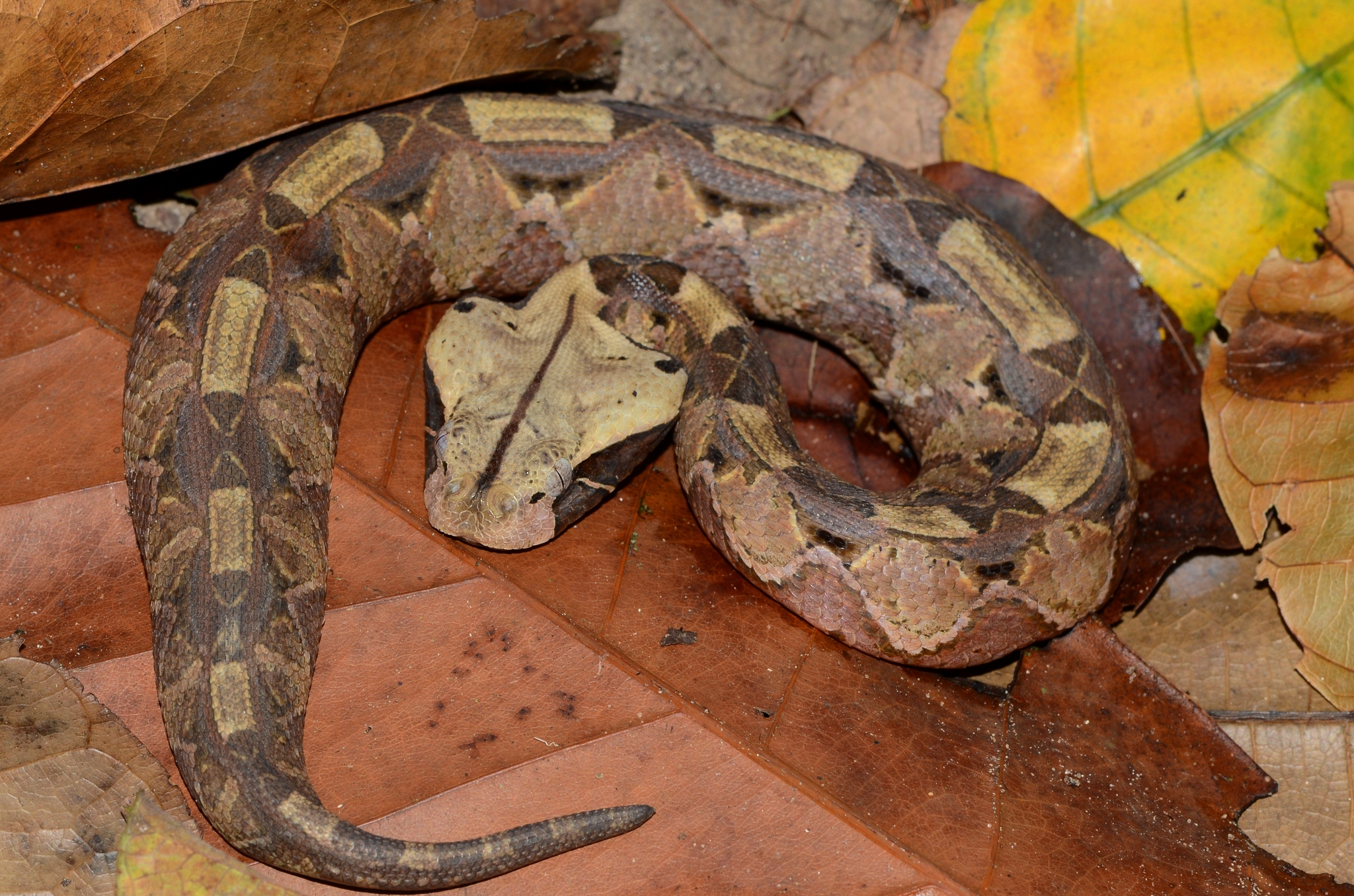
- Gabon viper
  Gabon viper
- Giant eland
- Giant forest hog
- Golden jackel
- Goliath heron
- Grant's gazelle
- Grant's zebra
- Great blue turaco
- Greater kudu
- Grévy's zebra
- Grey heron
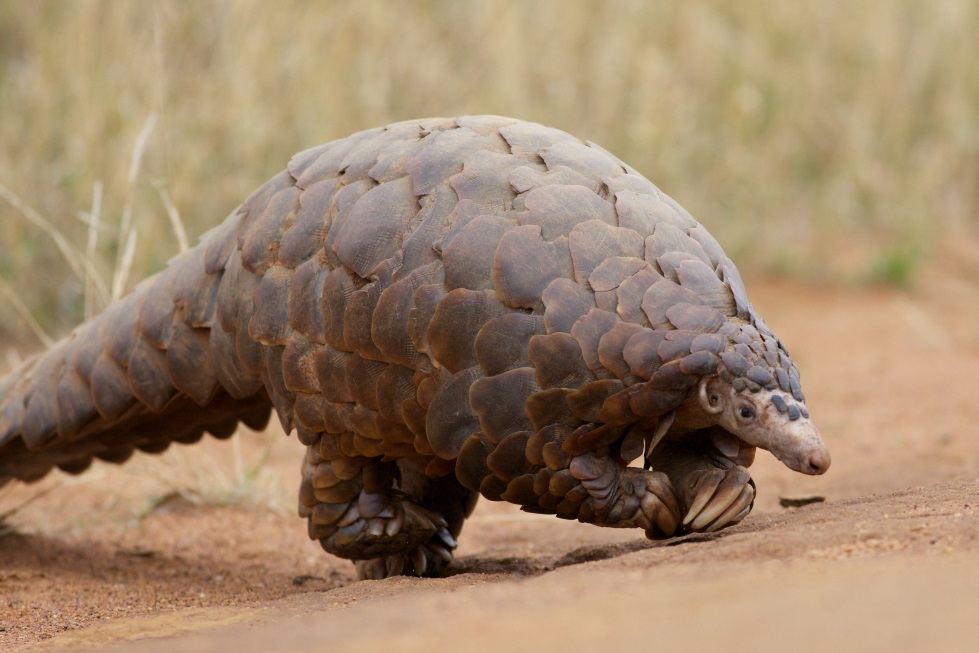
- Ground pangolin
  Ground pangolin
- Guenther's dik-dik
- Guinea fowl
- Half-edged wall jumping spider
- Hamerkop
- Hamilton's tomb bat
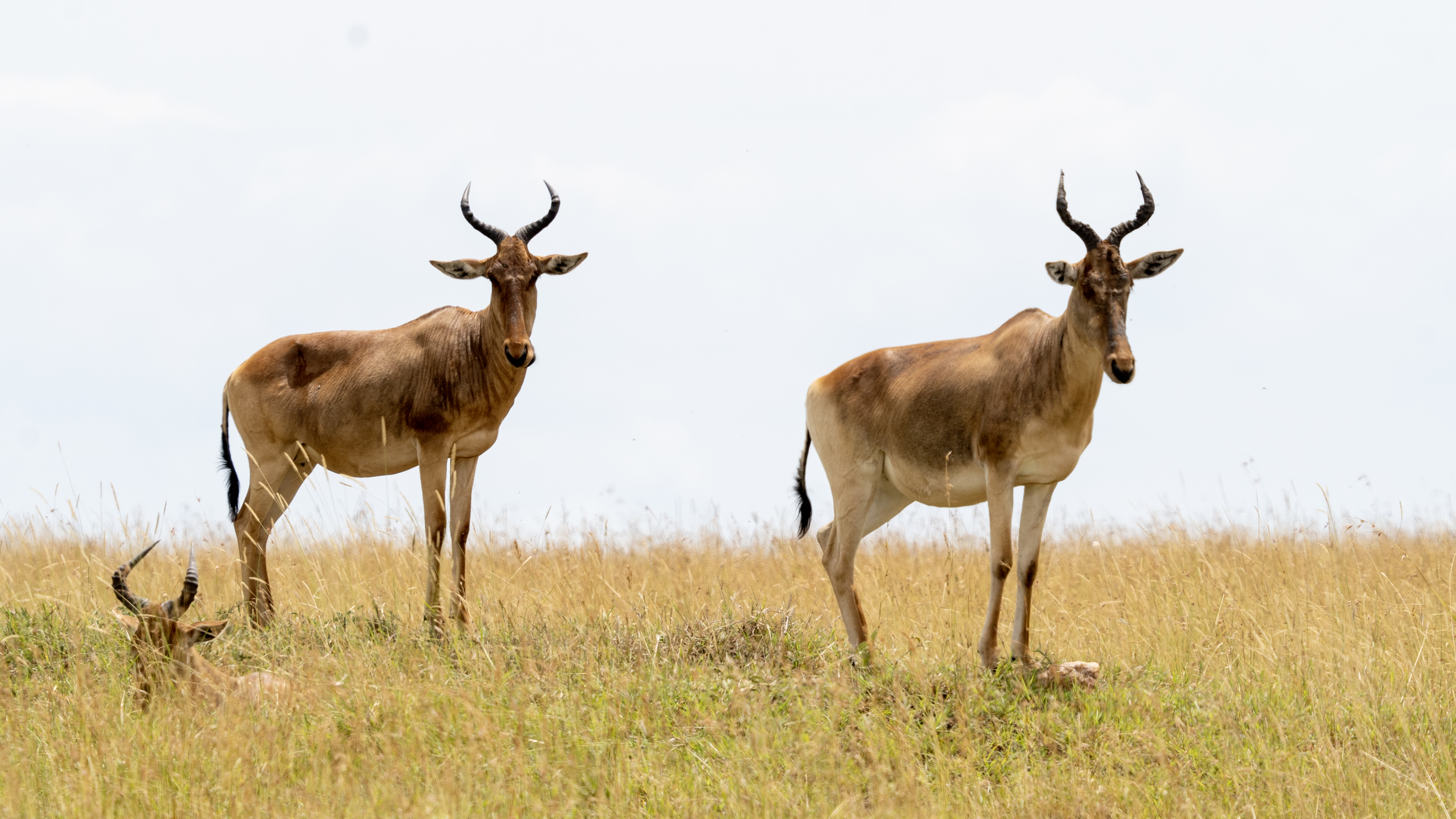
- Hartebeest
  Hartebeest
- Harvestmen
- Hippopotamus
- Honey badger
- Houndfish
- Jackson's soft-furred mouse
- Jigger
- Klipspringer
- Kordofan giraffe
- Korrigum
- Lelewel hartebeest
- Leopard
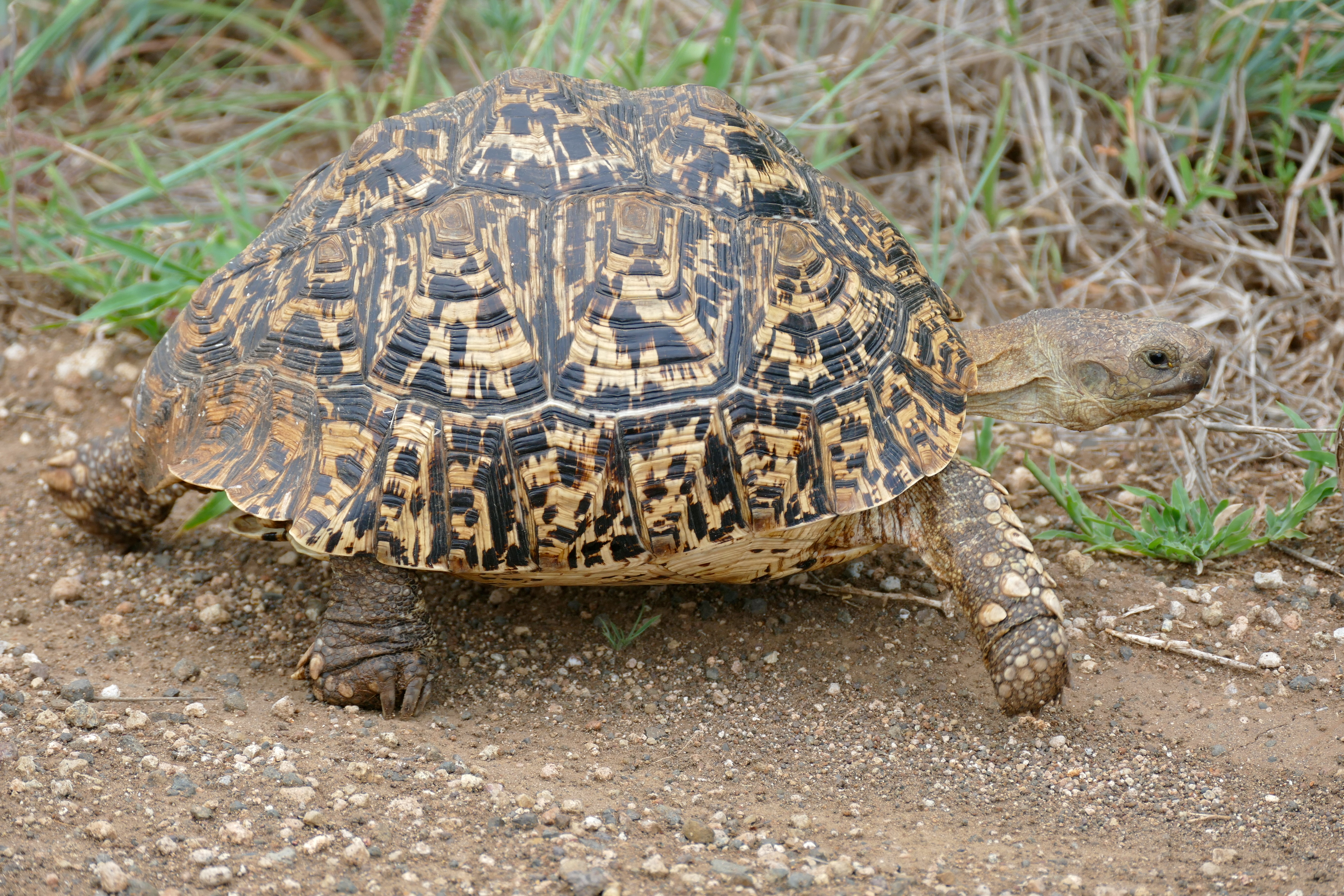
- Leopard tortoise
  Leopard tortoise
- Lesser kudu
- Lion
- Mandi
- Mantled guereza
- Marabou stork
- Marsh mongoose
- Marsh terrapin
- Martial eagle
- Mascarene grass frog
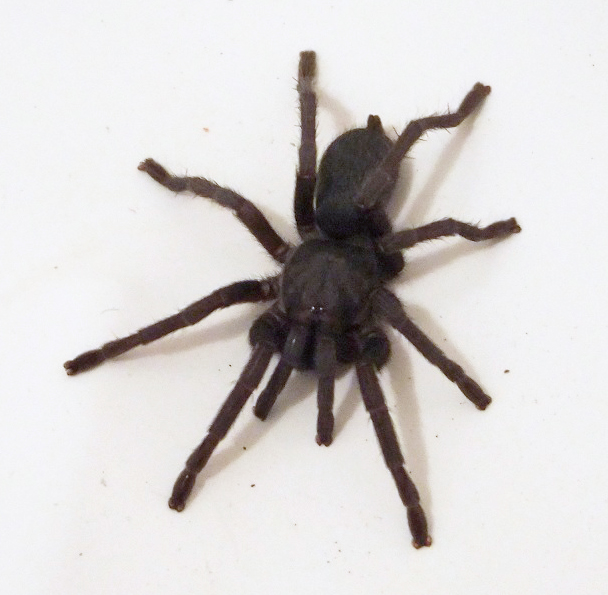
- Middle East black tarantula
  Middle East black tarantula
- Mongalla gazelle
- Mottled shovelnose frog
- Nile catfish
- Nile crocodile
- Nile grass frog
- Nile lechwe
- Nile monitor
- North African ostrich
- Northern giraffe
- Northern white rhinoceros
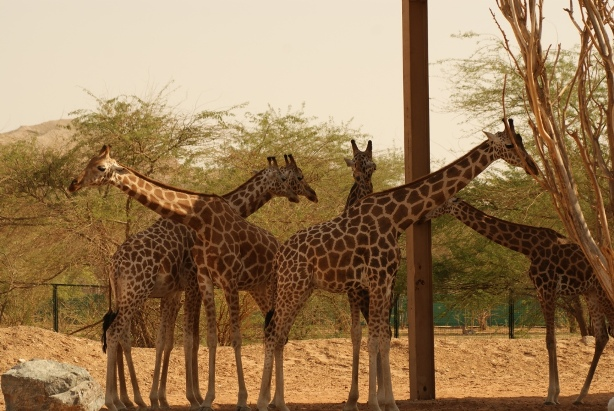
- Nubian giraffe (Giraffa camelopardalis camelopardalis)
  Nubian giraffe
- Olive baboon
- Oribi
- Pale fox
- Pantropical jumping spider
- Pearl-spotted owlet
- Pel's fishing owl
- Pennat-winged nightjar
- Penton’s toad
- Plains zebra
- Puff adder
- Red-chested cuckoo
- Red river hog
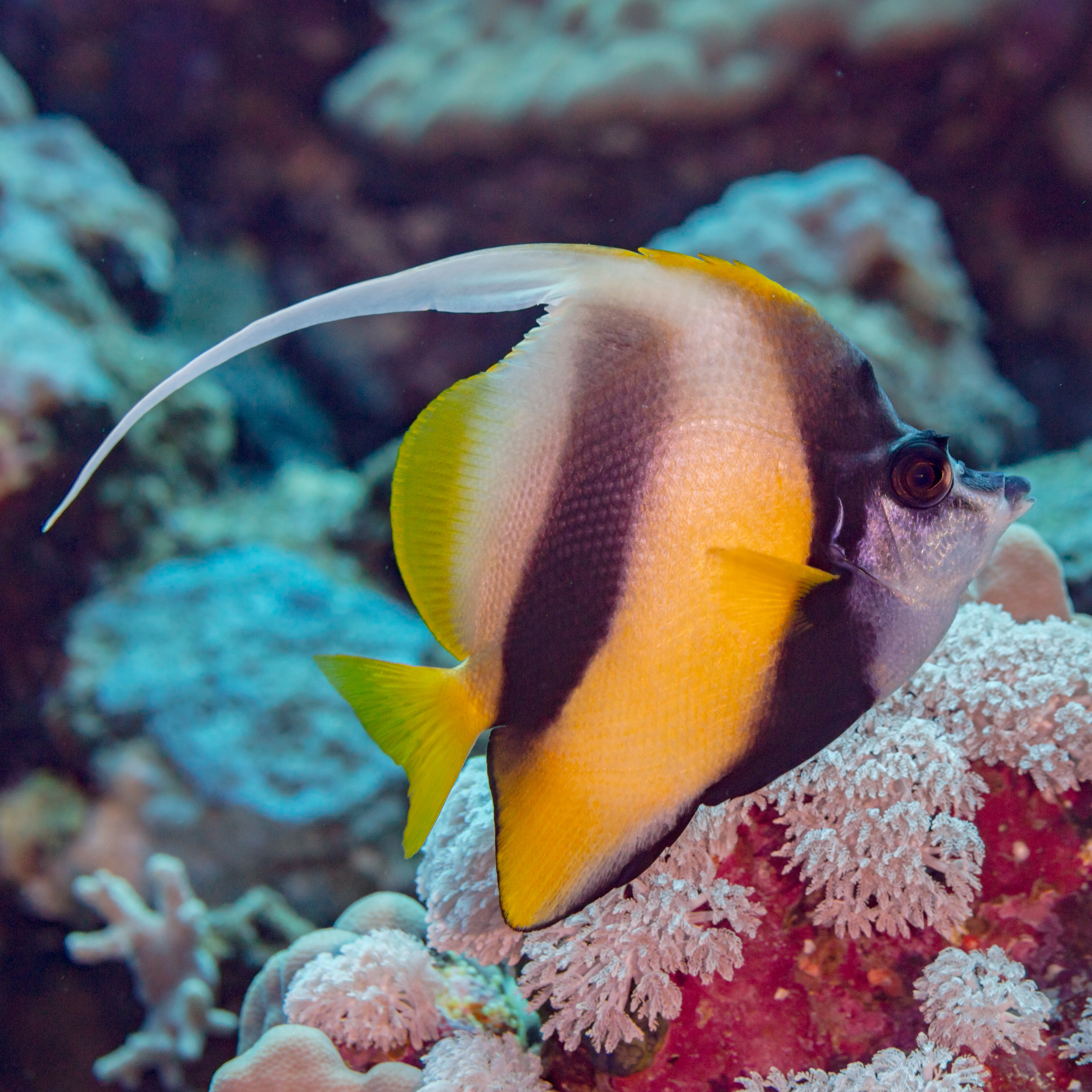
- Red Sea bannerfish
  Red Sea bannerfish
- Red Sea stonefish
- Red spitting cobra
- Ring-necked dove
- Roan antelope
- Rock hyrax
- Rüppell's fox
- Rupp's African climbing mouse
- Salt's dik-dik
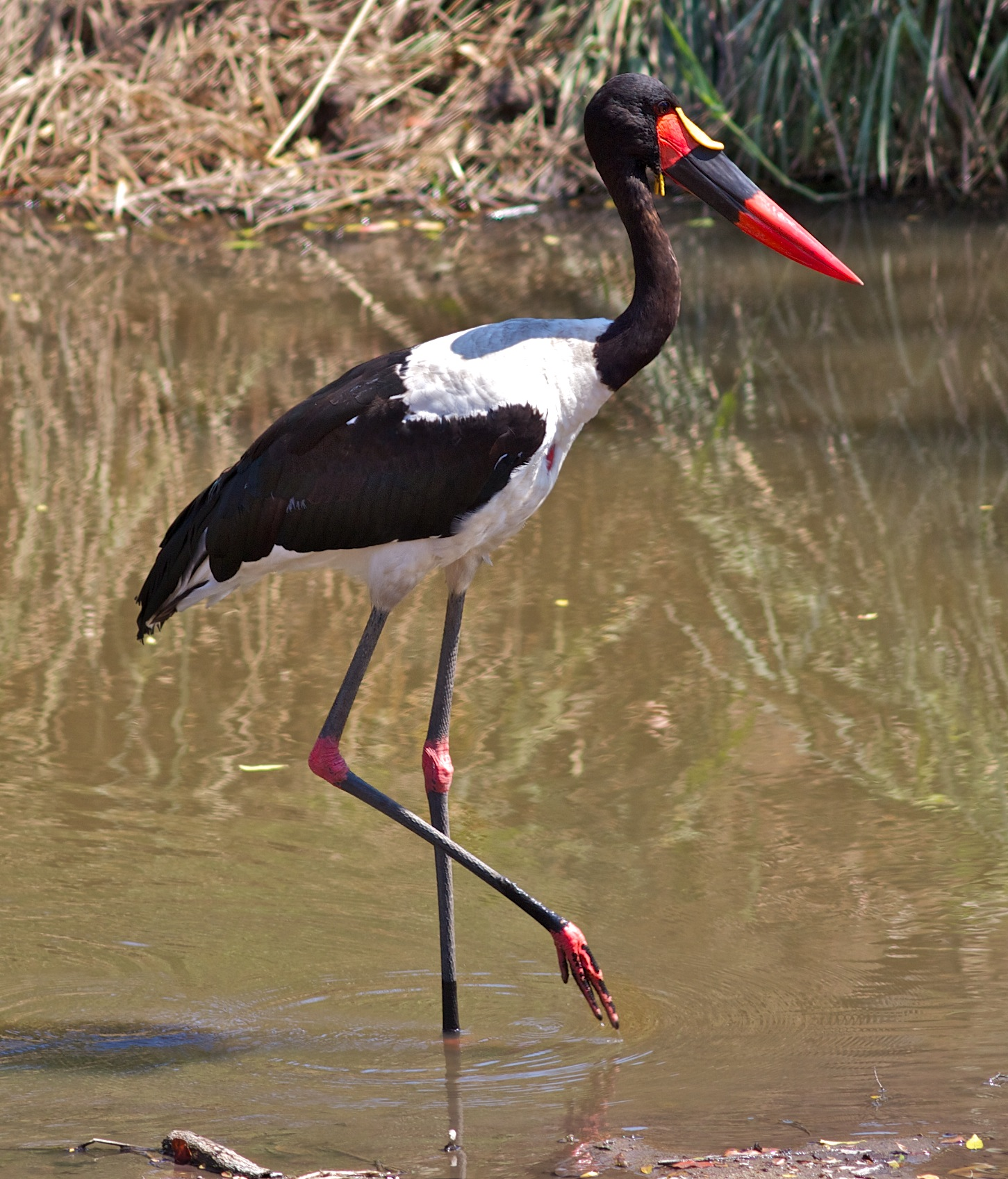
- Saddle-billed stork
  Saddle-billed stork
- Saharan horned viper
- Savannah monitor
- Sengal bushbaby
- Senegal coucal
- Serval
- Shikra
- Short-snouted elephant shrew
- Side-striped chameleon
- Side-striped jackal
- Sitatunga
- Slender mongoose
- Spiral-horned antelope
- Spotted ground thrush
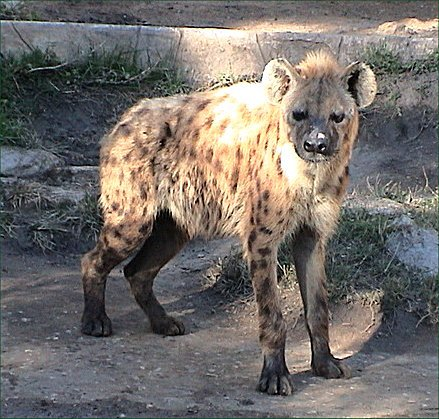
- Spotted hyena (Crocuta crocuta)
  Spotted hyena
- Steppe eagle
- Striped hyena
- Sudan puddle frog
- Sudanese horseshoe bat
- Thin sand-eel
- Tree pangolin
- Tropical house gecko
- Tropical tent-web spider
- Tsetse fly
- Tumbu fly
- Verreaux's eagle-owl
- Vervet monkey
- Wahrindi
- Warthog
- Waterbuck
- White-eared kob
- Wolf spiders
- Yellow-backed duiker
- Zorilla

== See also ==
- Great Nile Migration Landscape
