= Yirrkala macrodon =

Scientific classification
- Kingdom: Animalia
- Phylum: Chordata
- Class: Actinopterygii
- Order: Anguilliformes
- Family: Ophichthidae
- Genus: Yirrkala
- Species: Y. macrodon

Binomial name
- Yirrkala macrodon (Bleeker, 1863)

Synonyms
- Sphagebranchus macrodon Bleeker, 1863

Species of fish

Yirrkala macrodon is an eel in the family Ophichthidae (worm/snake eels). It was described by Pieter Bleeker in 1863, originally under the genus Sphagebranchus. It is a marine, tropical eel which is known from Borneo, in the western central Pacific Ocean.
