= Yirrkala kaupii =

Scientific classification
- Kingdom: Animalia
- Phylum: Chordata
- Class: Actinopterygii
- Order: Anguilliformes
- Family: Ophichthidae
- Genus: Yirrkala
- Species: Y. kaupii

Binomial name
- Yirrkala kaupii (Bleeker, 1858)

Synonyms
- Sphagebranchus kaupii Bleeker, 1858; Ophichthys kaupii (Bleeker, 1858); Caecula kaupi (Bleeker, 1858); Yirrkala kaupi (Bleeker, 1858)

Species of fish

Yirrkala kaupii is an eel in the family Ophichthidae (worm/snake eels). It was described by Pieter Bleeker in 1858, originally under the genus Sphagebranchus. It is a tropical, freshwater eel which is known from Indonesia and the Philippines. Males can reach a maximum total length of 35 centimetres (14 in).
