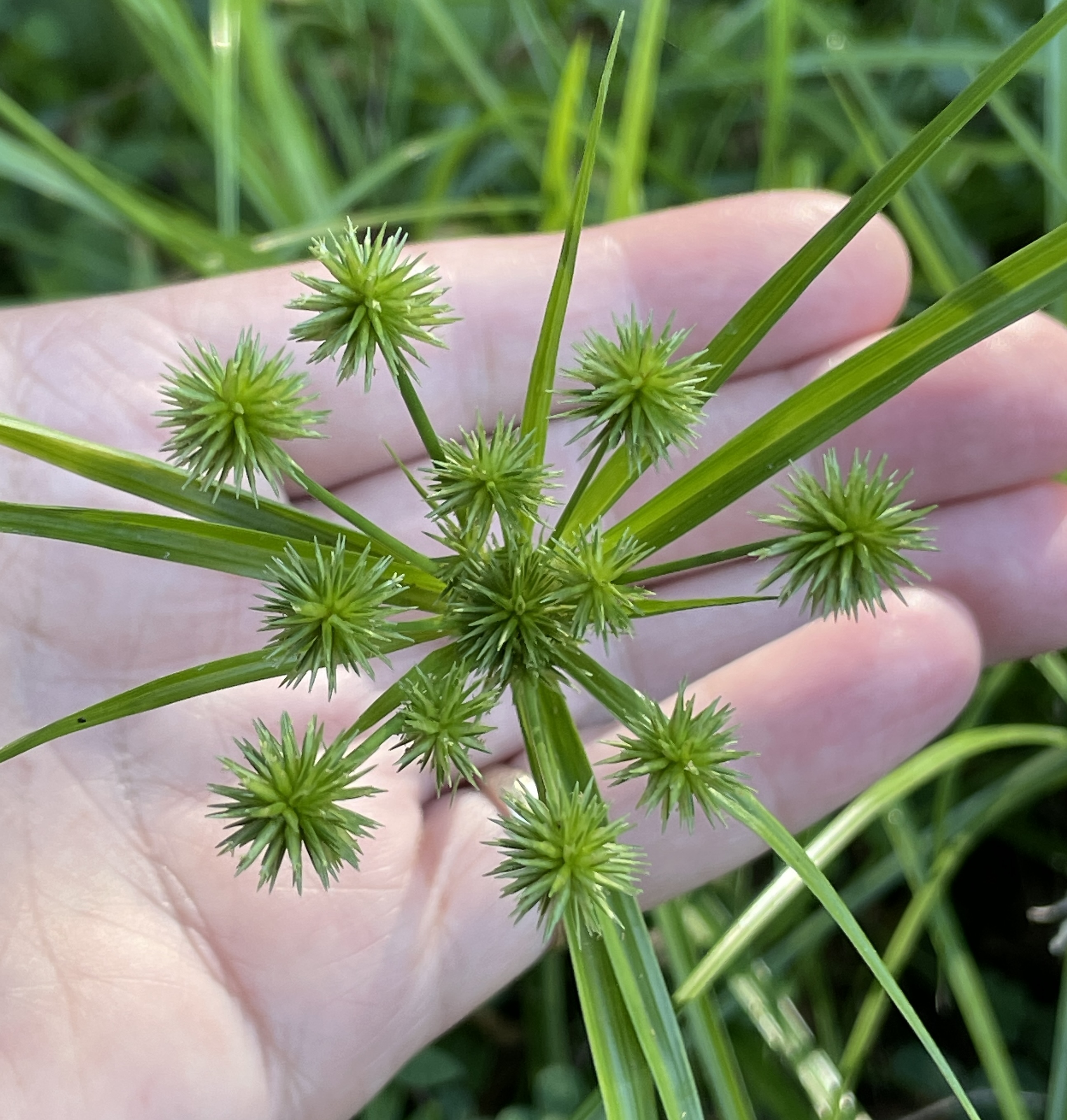

Conservation status
- Least Concern (IUCN 3.1)

Scientific classification
- Kingdom: Plantae
- Clade: Embryophytes
- Clade: Tracheophytes
- Clade: Spermatophytes
- Clade: Angiosperms
- Clade: Monocots
- Clade: Commelinids
- Order: Poales
- Family: Cyperaceae
- Genus: Cyperus
- Species: C. croceus

Binomial name
- Cyperus croceus Vahl

= Cyperus croceus =

Species of sedge

Cyperus croceus, commonly known as Baldwin's flatsedge, is a species of sedge that is native to parts of North America, Central America, and South America.

The species was first formally described by the botanist Martin Vahl in 1805.

C. croceus requires a semi-tropical climate for growth. It occurs in moist environments, and has been observed growing in floodplains and fluvial environments.

== See also ==
- List of Cyperus species
