= Ichthyapus acuticeps =

Conservation status
- Data Deficient (IUCN 3.1)

Scientific classification
- Kingdom: Animalia
- Phylum: Chordata
- Class: Actinopterygii
- Order: Anguilliformes
- Family: Ophichthidae
- Genus: Ichthyapus
- Species: I. acuticeps

Binomial name
- Ichthyapus acuticeps (Barnard, 1923)

Synonyms
- Sphagebranchus acuticeps Barnard, 1923; Caecula acuticeps (Barnard, 1923)

Species of fish

The sharpnose sand eel (Ichthyapus acuticeps) is an eel in the family Ophichthidae (worm/snake eels). It was described by Keppel Harcourt Barnard in 1923, originally under the genus Sphagebranchus. It is a marine, subtropical eel which is known from Zululand and Durban in South Africa, in the western Indian Ocean. Males can reach a maximum total length of 40 centimetres (16 in).
