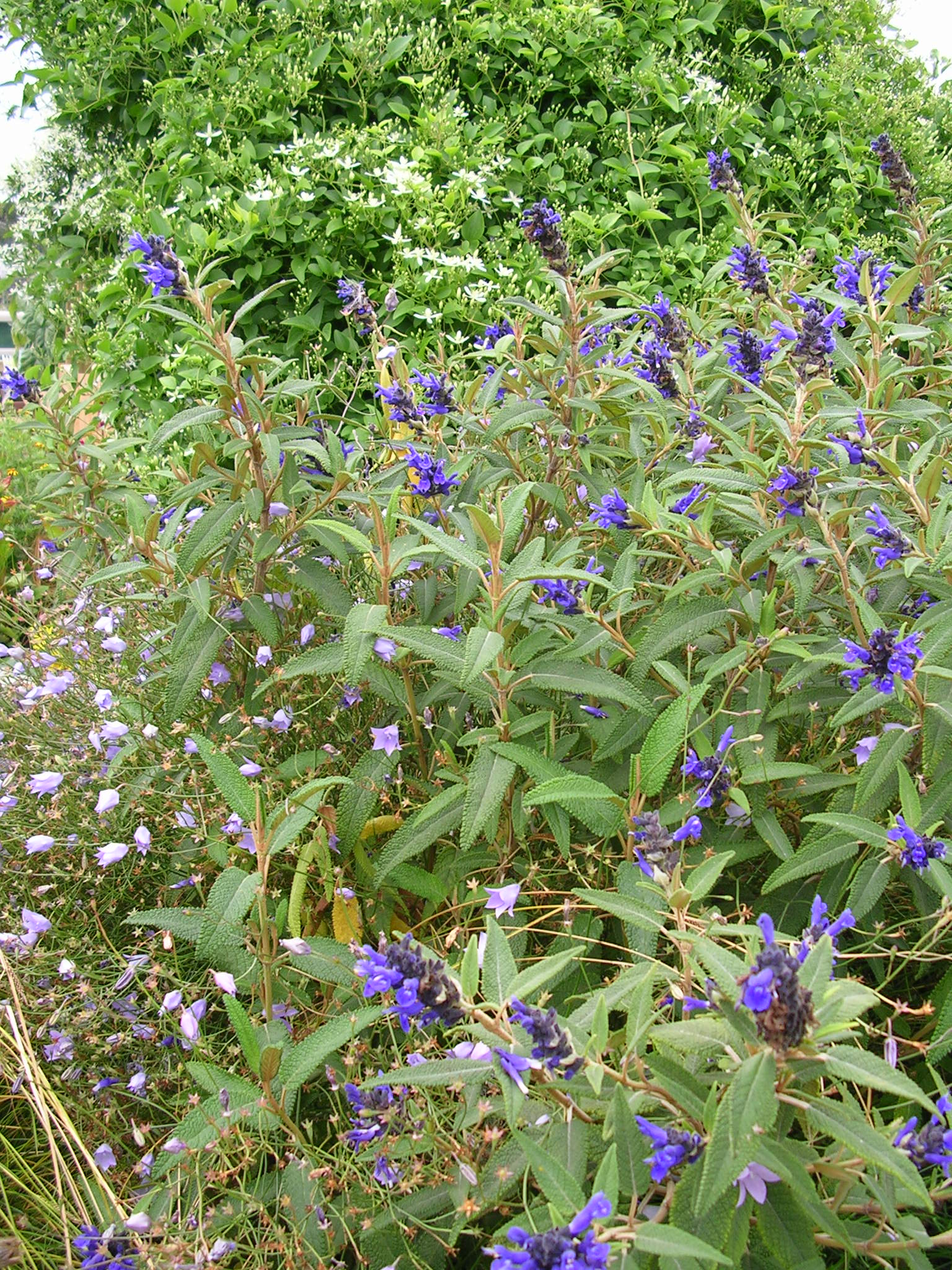

Scientific classification
- Kingdom: Plantae
- Clade: Tracheophytes
- Clade: Angiosperms
- Clade: Eudicots
- Clade: Asterids
- Order: Lamiales
- Family: Lamiaceae
- Genus: Salvia
- Species: S. corrugata

Binomial name
- Salvia corrugata Vahl

= Salvia corrugata =

Species of plant

Salvia corrugata is a perennial shrub native to Colombia, Peru, and Ecuador, growing at 8000–9800 ft elevation. It was brought into horticulture about 2000 as a result of a collecting trip to South America in 1988. All the plants in cultivation today are from six seeds that germinated from that trip.

Salvia corrugata reaches 9 ft in its native habitat, and 5–6 ft in cultivation. It has egg-shaped deeply corrugated evergreen leaves that are 4.5 in by 1.5 in, dark green on the top surface, and light veining with pale tan-colored fine hairs underneath. The brilliant purple-blue flowers are 1 in long, with a small dark purple and green calyx. The flowers grow in congested whorls, with 6–12 flowers on each 3–4 in inflorescence.
