= Yirrkala maculata =

Scientific classification
- Kingdom: Animalia
- Phylum: Chordata
- Class: Actinopterygii
- Order: Anguilliformes
- Family: Ophichthidae
- Genus: Yirrkala
- Species: Y. maculata

Binomial name
- Yirrkala maculata (Klausewitz, 1964)

Synonyms
- Caecula maculata Klausewitz, 1964

Species of fish

Yirrkala maculata is an eel in the family Ophichthidae (worm/snake eels). It was described by Wolfgang Klausewitz in 1964, originally under the genus Caecula. It is a marine, tropical eel which is known from the western central Pacific Ocean.
