= Cyperus ochraceus =

Scientific classification
- Kingdom: Plantae
- Clade: Tracheophytes
- Clade: Angiosperms
- Clade: Monocots
- Clade: Commelinids
- Order: Poales
- Family: Cyperaceae
- Genus: Cyperus
- Species: C. ochraceus

Binomial name
- Cyperus ochraceus Vahl

Species of sedge

Cyperus ochraceus is a species of sedge that is native to Central America, southern parts of North America and South America.

The species was first formally described by the botanist Martin Vahl in 1805.

== See also ==
- List of Cyperus species
