= Yirrkala (fish) =

Scientific classification
- Kingdom: Animalia
- Phylum: Chordata
- Class: Actinopterygii
- Order: Anguilliformes
- Family: Ophichthidae
- Subfamily: Ophichthinae
- Genus: Yirrkala; Whitley, 1940

Type species
- Yirrkala chaselingi Whitley, 1940

Synonyms
- Pantonora J. L. B. Smith, 1965

Genus of fishes

Yirrkala is a genus of eels in the snake eel family Ophichthidae. It is named after Yirrkala, an indigenous community in Arnhem Land, in the Northern Territory of Australia.

== Species ==
There are currently 15 recognized species in this genus:

- Yirrkala calyptra J. E. McCosker, 2011
- Yirrkala chaselingi Whitley, 1940
- Yirrkala fusca (Zuiew, 1793)
- Yirrkala gjellerupi (M. C. W. Weber & de Beaufort, 1916)
- Yirrkala insolitus J. E. McCosker, 1999
- Yirrkala kaupii (Bleeker, 1858)
- Yirrkala lumbricoides (Bleeker, 1864) (Earthworm snake-eel)
- Yirrkala macrodon (Bleeker, 1863)
- Yirrkala maculata (Klausewitz, 1964)
- Yirrkala misolensis (Günther, 1872) (Misol snake-eel)
- Yirrkala moluccensis (Bleeker, 1864)
- Yirrkala moorei J. E. McCosker, 2006
- Yirrkala nkust Hibino & Ho 2024
- Yirrkala omanensis (Norman, 1939) (Oman snake-eel)
- Yirrkala ori J. E. McCosker, 2011
- Yirrkala tenuis (Günther, 1870) (Thin sand-eel)
