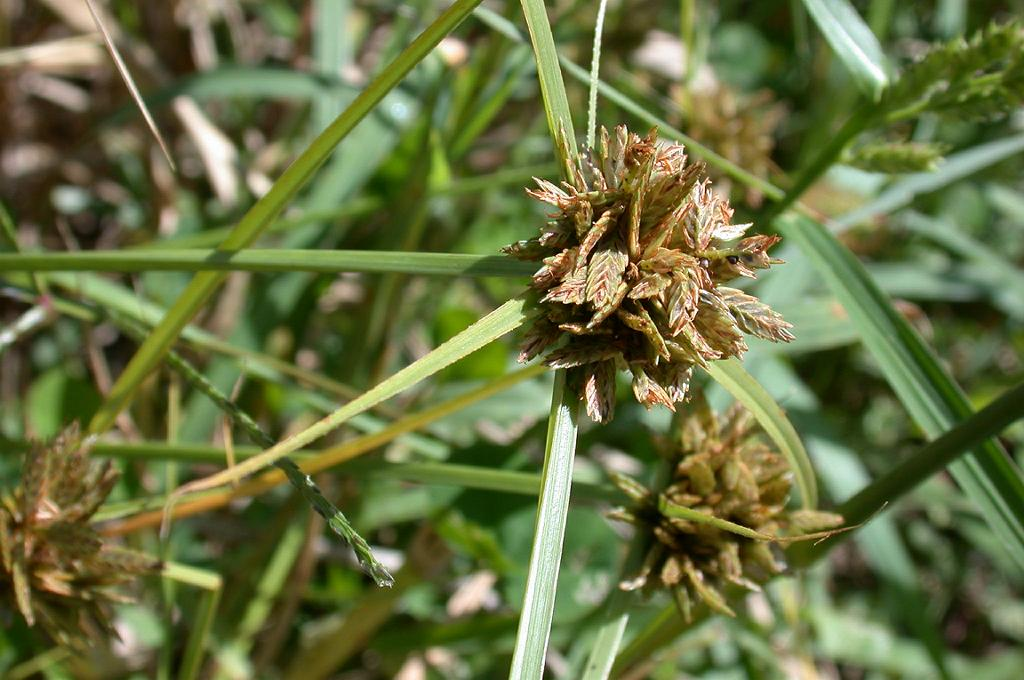

Scientific classification
- Kingdom: Plantae
- Clade: Tracheophytes
- Clade: Angiosperms
- Clade: Monocots
- Clade: Commelinids
- Order: Poales
- Family: Cyperaceae
- Genus: Cyperus
- Species: C. sanguinolentus

Binomial name
- Cyperus sanguinolentus Vahl

Synonyms
- Pycreus sanguinolentus (Vahl) Nees

= Cyperus sanguinolentus =

Purple-glume flat sedge

Species of grass-like plant

Cyperus sanguinolentus, the purple-glume flat sedge, is an erect sedge, solitary or tufted, growing from 5 to 80 cm tall. A widespread species, naturally found in many parts of Africa, India, Asia and Australasia. The specific epithet sanguinolentus is from Latin, and refers blood red colour of the seed.
