= Triodon =

Triodon may refer to:

- Triodon (fish), a genus of fish in the family Triodontidae
- Triodon (plant), a genus of plants now synonymized with Diodia

See also:

- Triodion, a liturgical book of the Orthodox Church
