= Oman snake eel =

Scientific classification
- Kingdom: Animalia
- Phylum: Chordata
- Class: Actinopterygii
- Order: Anguilliformes
- Family: Ophichthidae
- Genus: Yirrkala
- Species: Y. omanensis

Binomial name
- Yirrkala omanensis Norman, 1939

Synonyms
- Sphagebranchus omanensis Norman, 1939; Ichthyapus omanensis Norman, 1939

Species of fish

Yirrkala omanensis also known as the Oman snake eel is an eel in the family Ophichthidae (worm/snake eels). It was described by John Roxborough Norman in 1939, originally under the genus Sphagebranchus. It is a marine, tropical eel which is known from the Gulf of Oman (from which its species epithet and common name are derived), in the western Indian Ocean. It is known to dwell at a depth of 73 metres (240 ft). Males can reach a maximum total length of 23 centimetres (9.1 in).
