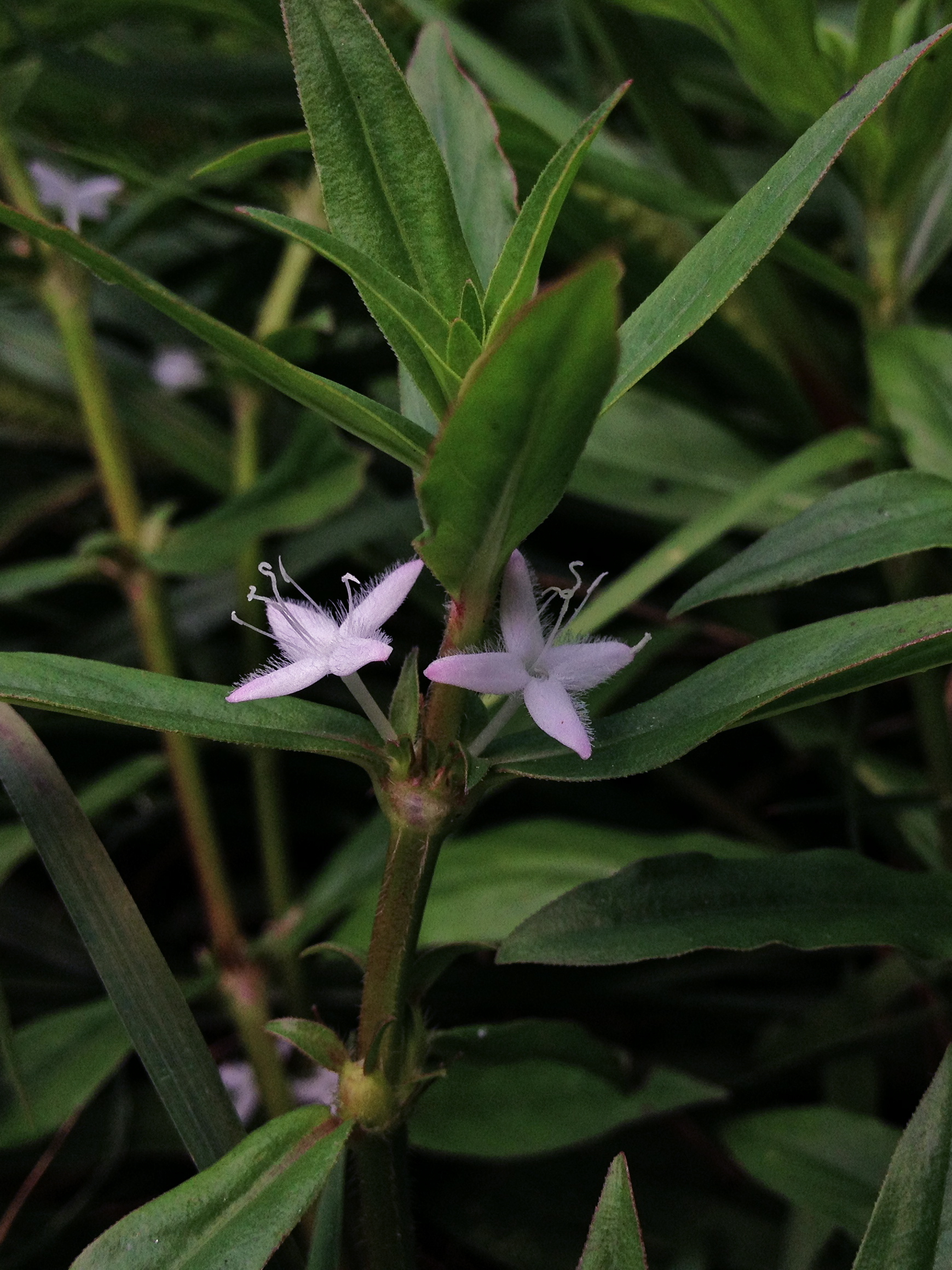
- A flowering Diodia virginiana

Scientific classification
- Kingdom: Plantae
- Clade: Tracheophytes
- Clade: Angiosperms
- Clade: Eudicots
- Clade: Asterids
- Order: Gentianales
- Family: Rubiaceae
- Tribe: Spermacoceae
- Genus: Diodia; L.

Type species
- Diodia virginiana L.

Synonyms
- Decapenta Raf. Dioneiodon Raf. Ebelia Rchb. Triodon DC.

= Diodia =

Genus of plants

Diodia (or buttonweed) is a genus of flowering plants in the family Rubiaceae. It was described by Carl Linnaeus in 1753. The genus is found from southern and eastern United States, South America, Central America, Mexico, the West Indies and tropical Africa.

== Other buttonweeds ==
Many species of Diodia have been transferred to a closely related genus Diodella, and therefore the name buttonweed also applies to these species. There are also many species of false buttonweeds in the related genus Spermacoce. Abutilon theophrasti in the family Malvaceae is also known by the common name of buttonweed.

== Species ==
- Diodia aulacosperma K.Schum. - Socotra, Somalia, Kenya, Tanzania
- Diodia barbata (Poir.) DC. - Guyana, Dominican Republic
- Diodia barbigera Hook. & Arn. - Mexico
- Diodia blepharophylla Standl. - Mexico
- Diodia discolor DC. - French Guiana
- Diodia flavescens Hiern - Angola, Zambia
- Diodia indecora DC. - Mexico
- Diodia kuntzei K.Schum. - Venezuela, Bolivia, Peru, Brazil, Argentina, Paraguay
- Diodia lithospermoides K.Schum. - Peru
- Diodia macrophylla K.Schum. - Brazil, Paraguay
- Diodia microcarpa K.Schum. ex Glaziou - Brazil
- Diodia mitens Bello - Puerto Rico
- Diodia othonii Rizzini - Brazil
- Diodia paludosa Kuntze - Paraguay
- Diodia perforata Urb. - Haiti
- Diodia rubricosa Hiern - Ghana, Ivory Coast, Liberia, Nigeria, Sierra Leone
- Diodia saponariifolia (Cham. & Schltdl.) K.Schum. - Central and South America
- Diodia saponarioides C.Presl - Mexico, Brazil, Argentina, Paraguay
- Diodia scandens Benth. - Western, Central, and Eastern Africa
- Diodia simplex Sw. - Cuba, Jamaica
- Diodia verticillata Vahl - Brazil, Lesser Antilles
- Diodia virginiana L. - Virginia buttonweed - south-central and south-eastern United States from Texas to Kansas, east to Florida and New Jersey; also Connecticut, Cuba and Nicaragua. Naturalized in Japan, Taiwan and northern California
