= Cyperus filicinus =

Conservation status
- Apparently Secure (NatureServe)

Scientific classification
- Kingdom: Plantae
- Clade: Embryophytes
- Clade: Tracheophytes
- Clade: Angiosperms
- Clade: Monocots
- Clade: Commelinids
- Order: Poales
- Family: Cyperaceae
- Genus: Cyperus
- Species: C. filicinus

Binomial name
- Cyperus filicinus Vahl

Species of sedge

Cyperus filicinus, commonly known as fern flatsedge, is a species of flatsedge that is native to eastern North America. It inhabits a variety of maritime habitats, including brackish marshes. It is an annual that produces widely spreading spikes. It fruits in the summer.
