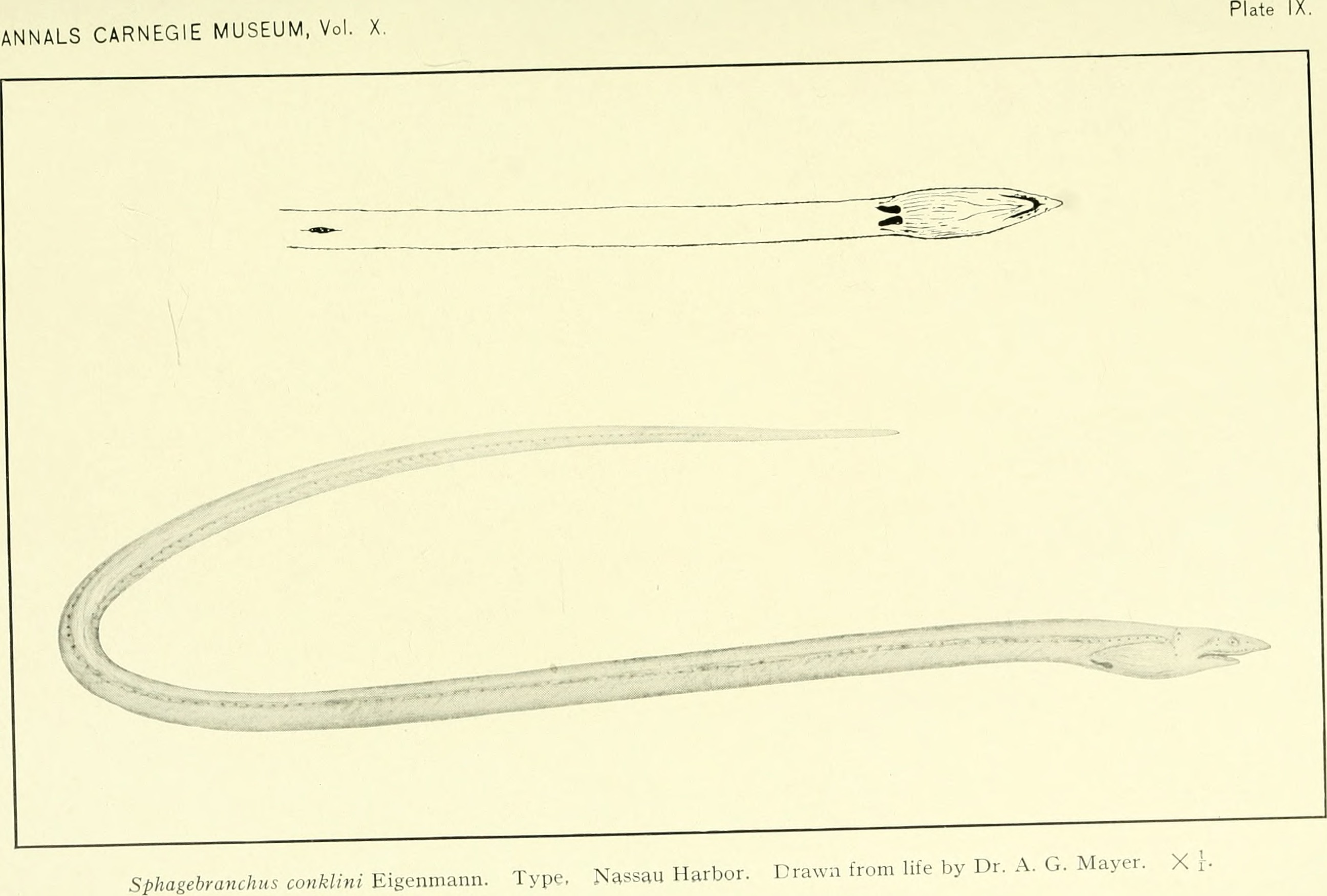

Conservation status
- Least Concern (IUCN 3.1)

Scientific classification
- Kingdom: Animalia
- Phylum: Chordata
- Class: Actinopterygii
- Order: Anguilliformes
- Family: Ophichthidae
- Genus: Ichthyapus
- Species: I. ophioneus

Binomial name
- Ichthyapus ophioneus (Evermann & Marsh, 1900)

Synonyms
- Sphagebranchus ophioneus Evermann & Marsh, 1900; Caecula ophioneus (Evermann & Marsh, 1900); Rhinenchelys ophioneus (Evermann & Marsh, 1900); Sphagebranchus conklini C. H. Eigenmann, 1916

= Surf eel =

Species of fish

The surf eel (Ichthyapus ophioneus), also known as the Finless snake eel in the United States, is an eel in the family Ophichthidae (worm/snake eels). It was described by Barton Warren Evermann and Millard Caleb Marsh in 1900, originally under the genus Sphagebranchus. It is a marine, tropical eel which is known from the western and eastern Atlantic Ocean, including Bermuda, the Bahamas, Florida, USA; Puerto Rico, the Virgin Islands, northern South America, and St. Helena Island. It dwells at a maximum depth of 35 metres (115 ft), most often between 5 and 15 metres (16 and 49 ft), and forms burrows in sand bottoms in surf areas, from which its common name is derived. Males can reach a maximum total length of 45 centimetres (18 in).
