= Yirrkala fusca =

Scientific classification
- Kingdom: Animalia
- Phylum: Chordata
- Class: Actinopterygii
- Order: Anguilliformes
- Family: Ophichthidae
- Genus: Yirrkala
- Species: Y. fusca

Binomial name
- Yirrkala fusca (Zuiew, 1793)

Synonyms
- Muraena fusca Zuiew, 1793

Species of fish

Yirrkala fusca is an eel in the family Ophichthidae (worm/snake eels). It was described by Vasily Zuyev in 1793. It is a marine, tropical eel.
