= Finny snake eel =

Scientific classification
- Domain: Eukaryota
- Kingdom: Animalia
- Phylum: Chordata
- Class: Actinopterygii
- Order: Anguilliformes
- Family: Ophichthidae
- Genus: Caecula
- Species: C. pterygera

Binomial name
- Caecula pterygera Vahl, 1794

Species of fish

The finny snake eel (Caecula pterygera) is an eel in the family Ophichthidae (worm/snake eels). It was described by Martin Vahl in 1794. It is a marine, tropical eel which is known from the Indian Ocean, including southern India. It is known to inhabit inshore areas of turbid waters and estuaries, though not specifically for breeding purposes. Males can reach a maximum total length of 30 centimetres, but more commonly reach a TL of 20 cm.

The finny snake eel is marketed fresh, and used primarily for fishing bait.
