= Vulture sand eel =

Conservation status
- Least Concern (IUCN 3.1)

Scientific classification
- Kingdom: Animalia
- Phylum: Chordata
- Class: Actinopterygii
- Order: Anguilliformes
- Family: Ophichthidae
- Genus: Ichthyapus
- Species: I. vulturis

Binomial name
- Ichthyapus vulturis (Weber & de Beaufort, 1916)

Synonyms
- Sphagebranchus vulturis Weber & de Beaufort, 1916; Ichthyapus vulturus (Weber & de Beaufort, 1916)

Species of fish

The Vulture sand eel (Ichthyapus vulturis, also known as the Vulture eel) is an eel in the family Ophichthidae (worm/snake eels). It was described by Max Carl Wilhelm Weber and Lieven Ferdinand de Beaufort in 1916, originally under the genus Sphagebranchus. It is a marine, tropical eel which is known from the Indo-Pacific, including Mascarenes, Pitcairn, Japan, Australia, Micronesia, and Easter Island. It dwells in inshore waters at a depth range of 2 to 18 metres (6.6 to 59.1 ft), and forms burrows in soft, sandy sediments.

The Vulture sand eel's diet consists of bony fish.
