= Yirrkala chaselingi =

Scientific classification
- Kingdom: Animalia
- Phylum: Chordata
- Class: Actinopterygii
- Order: Anguilliformes
- Family: Ophichthidae
- Genus: Yirrkala
- Species: Y. chaselingi

Binomial name
- Yirrkala chaselingi Whitley, 1940

Species of fish

Yirrkala chaselingi, known commonly as the chingilt in Australia, is an eel in the family Ophichthidae (worm/snake eels). It was described by Gilbert Percy Whitley in 1940. It is a marine, tropical eel which is known from the western central Pacific Ocean.
