= Earthworm snake-eel =

Scientific classification
- Kingdom: Animalia
- Phylum: Chordata
- Class: Actinopterygii
- Order: Anguilliformes
- Family: Ophichthidae
- Genus: Yirrkala
- Species: Y. lumbricoides

Binomial name
- Yirrkala lumbricoides (Bleeker, 1864)

Synonyms
- Ophichthus timorensis Günther, 1870; Yirrkala timorensis Günther, 1870

Species of fish

The earthworm snake-eel Yirrkala lumbricoides (Bleeker, 1864), (previously Yirrkala timorensis) is an eel in the family Ophichthidae (worm/snake eels). It is a tropical, marine eel which is known from the Indo-Pacific. It is known to dwell at a depth of 20 metres. Males can reach a total length of 44 centimetres.
