= Ichthyapus =

Scientific classification
- Kingdom: Animalia
- Phylum: Chordata
- Class: Actinopterygii
- Order: Anguilliformes
- Family: Ophichthidae
- Subfamily: Ophichthinae
- Genus: Ichthyapus; Brisout de Barneville, 1847

Type species
- Ichthyapus acutirostris Brisout de Barneville, 1847

Synonyms
- Rhinenchelys Blache & Bauchot, 1972

Genus of fishes

Ichthyapus is a genus of eels in the snake eel family Ophichthidae.

== Species ==
There are currently 7 recognized species in this genus:

- Ichthyapus acuticeps Barnard, 1923 (Sharpnose sand eel)
- Ichthyapus insularis J. E. McCosker, 2004
- Ichthyapus keramanus Machida, Hasimoto & Yamakawa, 1997
- Ichthyapus ophioneus Evermann & M. C. Marsh, 1900 (Surf eel)
- Ichthyapus platyrhynchus Gosline, 1951
- Ichthyapus selachops D. S. Jordan & C. H. Gilbert, 1882 (Smiling snake eel)
- Ichthyapus vulturis M. C. W. Weber & de Beaufort, 1916 (Vulture sand eel)
