= Hexasepalum sarmentosum =

Scientific classification
- Kingdom: Plantae
- Clade: Tracheophytes
- Clade: Angiosperms
- Clade: Eudicots
- Clade: Asterids
- Order: Gentianales
- Family: Rubiaceae
- Genus: Hexasepalum
- Species: H. sarmentosum

Binomial name
- Hexasepalum sarmentosum (Sw.) Delprete & J.H.Kirkbr. (2015)

Synonyms
- Diodia sarmentosa Sw.; Diodella sarmentosa (Sw.) Bacigalupo & E.L.Cabral ex Borhidi

Species of plant

Hexasepalum sarmentosum is a species of scrambling annual or subshrub in the family Rubiaceae which is native to Afrotropical realm and Central and South America as well as having been introduced in Hawaii and parts of the Malay Archipelago. It is also referred to as tropical buttonweed in English and ewe opaeyin or ewe ohaigbo in Nigeria and has documented uses in traditional herbal medicines.
