= Ichthyapus keramanus =

Conservation status
- Data Deficient (IUCN 3.1)

Scientific classification
- Kingdom: Animalia
- Phylum: Chordata
- Class: Actinopterygii
- Order: Anguilliformes
- Family: Ophichthidae
- Genus: Ichthyapus
- Species: I. keramanus

Binomial name
- Ichthyapus keramanus Machida, Hasimoto & Yamakawa, 1997

Synonyms
- Apterichtus keramanus Machida, Hasimoto & Yamakawa, 1997

Species of fish

Ichthyapus keramanus is a species of snake eel native to the western Pacific Ocean where it is only known to occur around the Kerama Islands near Okinawa, Japan. It is known to occur at depths of from 25 to 50 metres (82 to 164 ft). This species can reach a length of 27.6 centimetres (10.9 in) TL. This species is placed in the genus Ichthyapus.
