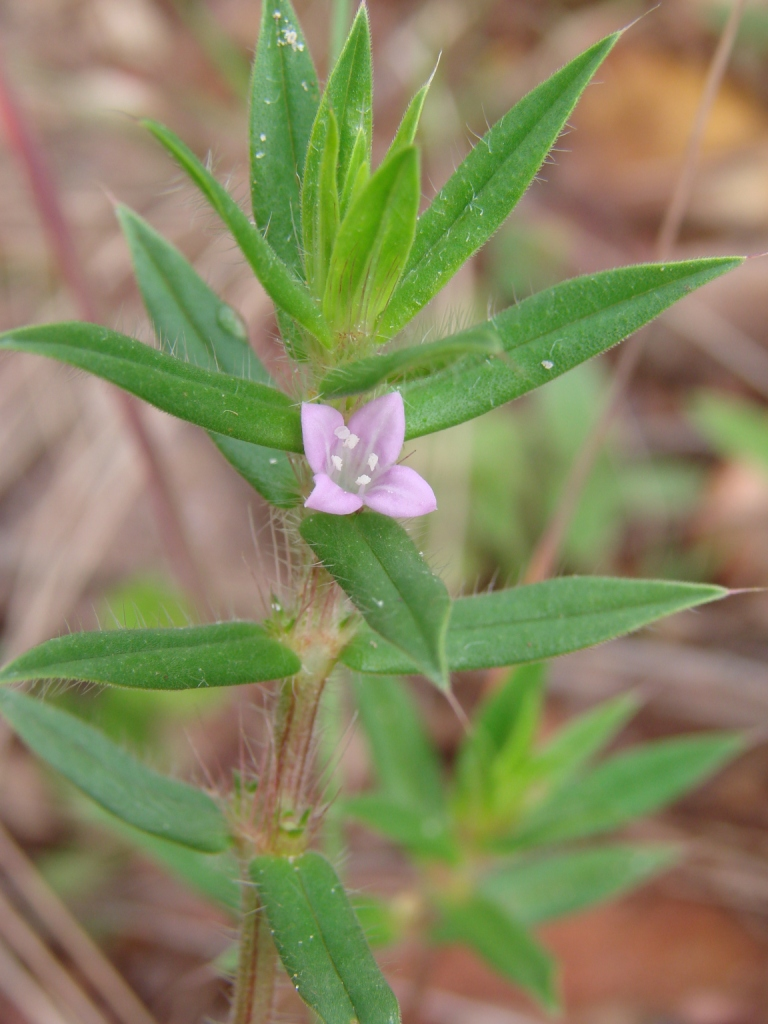

Scientific classification
- Kingdom: Plantae
- Clade: Tracheophytes
- Clade: Angiosperms
- Clade: Eudicots
- Clade: Asterids
- Order: Gentianales
- Family: Rubiaceae
- Genus: Hexasepalum
- Species: H. teres

Binomial name
- Hexasepalum teres (Walter) J.H.Kirkbr.

Synonyms
- List: Borreria shandongensis F.Z.Li & X.D.Chen; Diodella teres (Walter) Small; Diodia incana Aresch.; Diodia procumbens Sw. ex DC.; Diodia prostrata Sw.; Diodia teres Walter; Endopogon pumilum Raf.; Spermacoce diodina Michx.; Spermacoce holmiana Schult. ex Steud.; Spermacoce shandongensis (F.Z.Li & X.D.Chen) Govaerts

= Hexasepalum teres =

Species of flowering plant

Hexasepalum teres is a species of flowering plant in the coffee family known by the common names poorjoe and rough buttonweed. This annual plant is native to Mexico, Central America, South America, the West Indies and the United States from California to Florida and from Kansas to Massachusetts. The species is also naturalized in the Netherlands, the Canary Islands, Western Africa, Angola, China, Japan and Korea, India, and Madagascar.

Hexasepalum teres has a thin, erect or prostrate stem rarely up to 65 cm (26 in) in height. It has opposite leaves which are stiff, dark green, elliptical, pointed, and roughly-textured, up to 3 cm (1.2 in) long. Each pair of leaves cradles a flower at its base. The small white to pinkish-purple flower has four stiff petal-like lobes up to 12 mm (0.47 in) long and 10 mm (0.39 in) wide. The fruit is ellipsoid, splitting into two nutlets This plant is most common in sandy areas such as desert dunes and river floodplains.
