= Yirrkala insolitus =

Scientific classification
- Kingdom: Animalia
- Phylum: Chordata
- Class: Actinopterygii
- Order: Anguilliformes
- Family: Ophichthidae
- Genus: Yirrkala
- Species: Y. insolitus

Binomial name
- Yirrkala insolitus McCosker, 1999

Species of fish

Yirrkala insolitus is an eel in the family Ophichthidae (worm/snake eels). It was described by John E. McCosker in 1999. It is a marine, tropical eel which is known from New Caledonia, in the western Pacific Ocean. It is known to dwell at a depth of 59 metres (194 ft). Females can reach a maximum total length of 25.8 centimetres (10.2 in).

The species epithet "insolitus" means "strange" or "unusual".
