= Yirrkala gjellerupi =

Scientific classification
- Kingdom: Animalia
- Phylum: Chordata
- Class: Actinopterygii
- Order: Anguilliformes
- Family: Ophichthidae
- Genus: Yirrkala
- Species: Y. gjellerupi

Binomial name
- Yirrkala gjellerupi (Weber & de Beaufort, 1916)

Synonyms
- Sphagebranchus gjellerupi Weber & de Beaufort, 1916

Species of fish

Yirrkala gjellerupi is an eel in the family Ophichthidae (worm/snake eels). It was described by Max Carl Wilhelm Weber and Lieven Ferdinand de Beaufort in 1916. It is a tropical, freshwater eel which is known from northern New Guinea (Indonesia). It can reach a maximum total length of 15.3 centimetres (6.0 in).
