= Naturhistorieselskabet =

Naturhistorieselskabet (lit. 'the Society for Natural History') was a private society that was the only institution to offer education in natural history in Denmark in the late 18th century.

== History ==
The spirit of the Age of Enlightenment and an escalating agricultural crisis, led the king and the Danish elite to call foreign experts on economy, including botany and silviculture, to the country. The autonomous University of Copenhagen, on the other hand, was reluctant to employ foreign experts in little-established disciplines. Naturhistorieselskabet was formed in 1788 in order to ensure education in botany, zoology and mineralogy based on private funds. For example, Martin Vahl lectured in botany. After the appointment in 1795 of a professor in geology and in 1797 one in botany, the society gradually lost its importance. It was soon abolished and its collections donated to the state (much later united with the university collections).

== Sources ==
- Wagner, P.H. 2001. Institutionaliseringen af botanik og geologi i Danmark-Norge i det 18. århundrede (colloquium). Institut for Videnskabshistorie.
