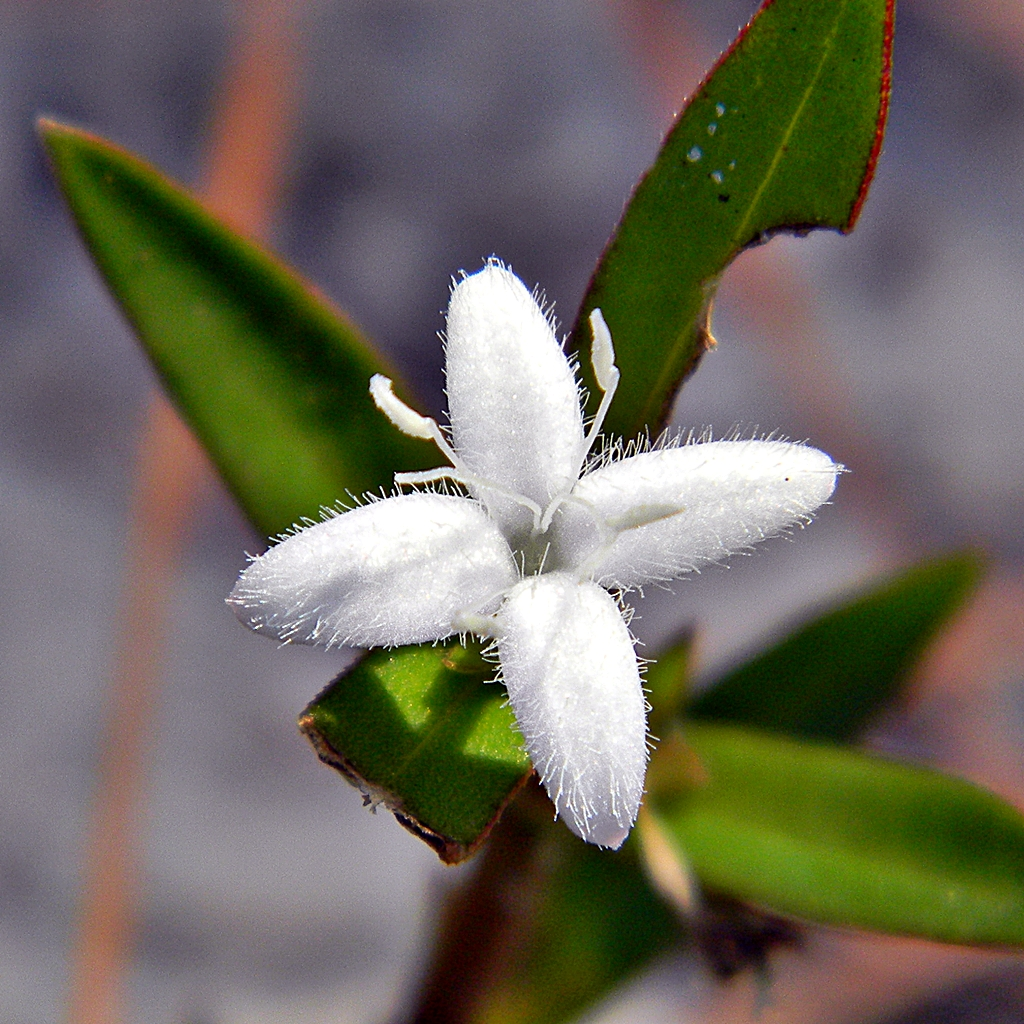

Conservation status
- Secure (NatureServe)

Scientific classification
- Kingdom: Plantae
- Clade: Tracheophytes
- Clade: Angiosperms
- Clade: Eudicots
- Clade: Asterids
- Order: Gentianales
- Family: Rubiaceae
- Genus: Diodia
- Species: D. virginiana

Binomial name
- Diodia virginiana L.

= Diodia virginiana =

Virginia buttonweed

Species of plant

Diodia virginiana is a plant species in the Rubiaceae, common name Virginia buttonweed.

== Description ==
It is a spreading, matted perennial with opposite leaves, often mottled because of a virus that attacks the foliage. The leaves range in length between 2 and 7 centimeters (approximately 0.8 to 2.8 inches) and tend to be between 4 and 12 millimeters in width. Flowers are white, cross-shaped with four petals. Fruits are green, often floating on water. The species can become a nuisance weed, hard to eradicate because of underground parts that remain behind when you try to pull up the plant.

== Distribution and habitat ==
Diodia virginiana is native to Cuba, Nicaragua, Mexico, Connecticut, and the south-central and southeastern United States. It is known from every state on the Gulf and Atlantic coasts from Texas to New Jersey as well as all the states in the Tennessee and Ohio River Valleys and the southern Great Plains. The species is also naturalized in Japan, Taiwan and northern California.

Its habitats include edges of marshes, savanna margins, and low fields.
