= Ichthyapus platyrhynchus =

Conservation status
- Least Concern (IUCN 3.1)

Scientific classification
- Kingdom: Animalia
- Phylum: Chordata
- Class: Actinopterygii
- Division: Teleostei
- Order: Anguilliformes
- Family: Ophichthidae
- Genus: Ichthyapus
- Species: I. platyrhynchus

Binomial name
- Ichthyapus platyrhynchus (Gosline, 1951)

Synonyms
- Caecula platyrhyncha Gosline, 1951

Species of fish

Ichthyapus platyrhynchus is an eel in the family Ophichthidae (worm/snake eels). It was described by William Alonzo Gosline in 1951. It is a marine, tropical eel which is known from Hawaii, in the eastern Pacific Ocean. It forms burrows in sand sediments.
