= Yirrkala moluccensis =

Scientific classification
- Kingdom: Animalia
- Phylum: Chordata
- Class: Actinopterygii
- Order: Anguilliformes
- Family: Ophichthidae
- Genus: Yirrkala
- Species: Y. moluccensis

Binomial name
- Yirrkala moluccensis (Bleeker, 1864)

Synonyms
- Pisoodonophis moluccensis Bleeker, 1864

Species of fish

Yirrkala moluccensis is an eel in the family Ophichthidae (worm/snake eels). It was described by Pieter Bleeker in 1864, originally under the genus Pisoodonophis. It is a marine, tropical eel which is known from Indonesia, in the western central Pacific Ocean.
