= Yirrkala calyptra =

Scientific classification
- Kingdom: Animalia
- Phylum: Chordata
- Class: Actinopterygii
- Order: Anguilliformes
- Family: Ophichthidae
- Genus: Yirrkala
- Species: Y. calyptra

Binomial name
- Yirrkala calyptra McCosker, 2011

Species of fish

Yirrkala calyptra is an eel in the family Ophichthidae (worm/snake eels). It was described by John E. McCosker in 2011. It is a marine, tropical eel which is known from Queensland Australia, in the western Pacific Ocean. Males can reach a maximum total length of 35.8 centimetres (14.1 in), while females can reach a maximum TL of 39.5 centimetres (15.6 in).

The species epithet "calyptra", treated as a noun in apposition, means "veil" in Greek, and refers to the eel's facial colouring.
