= Smiling snake eel =

Conservation status
- Least Concern (IUCN 3.1)

Scientific classification
- Kingdom: Animalia
- Phylum: Chordata
- Class: Actinopterygii
- Order: Anguilliformes
- Family: Ophichthidae
- Genus: Ichthyapus
- Species: I. selachops

Binomial name
- Ichthyapus selachops (Jordan & Gilbert, 1882)

Synonyms
- Apterichthys selachops Jordan & Gilbert, 1882

Species of fish

The smiling snake eel (Ichthyapus selachops, also known as the smiling sand eel) is an eel in the family Ophichthidae (worm/snake eels). It was described by David Starr Jordan and Charles Henry Gilbert in 1882, originally under the genus Apterichthys. It is a marine, tropical eel which is known from the eastern central and southeastern Pacific Ocean, including Colombia, Costa Rica, Panama, Ecuador, and Mexico. It dwells at a maximum depth of 30 metres (98 ft), and inhabits sediments of sand. Males can reach a maximum total length of 41 centimetres (16 in).

Due to its wide distribution, lack of known threats, and lack of observed population decline, the IUCN redlist currently lists the Smiling snake-eel as Least Concern.
