= Yirrkala moorei =

Scientific classification
- Kingdom: Animalia
- Phylum: Chordata
- Class: Actinopterygii
- Order: Anguilliformes
- Family: Ophichthidae
- Genus: Yirrkala
- Species: Y. moorei

Binomial name
- Yirrkala moorei McCosker, 2006

Species of fish

Yirrkala moorei is an eel in the family Ophichthidae (worm/snake eels). It was described by John E. McCosker in 2006. It is a marine, tropical eel which is known from the western central Pacific Ocean, including Marquesas and American Samoa. It dwells at a depth range of 25 to 454 metres (82 to 1,490 ft). A juvenile male specimen measured a total length of 43.4 centimetres (17.1 in).

The species epithet "moorei" refers to Gordon E. Moore.
