= Caecula kuro =

Scientific classification
- Domain: Eukaryota
- Kingdom: Animalia
- Phylum: Chordata
- Class: Actinopterygii
- Order: Anguilliformes
- Family: Ophichthidae
- Genus: Caecula
- Species: C. kuro

Binomial name
- Caecula kuro (Kuroda, 1947)

Synonyms
- Aphthalmichthys kuro Kuroda, 1947; Sphagebranchus kuro (Kuroda, 1947); Yirrkala kuro (Kuroda, 1947)

Species of fish

Caecula kuro is an eel in the family Ophichthidae (worm/snake eels). It was described by Nagamichi Kuroda in 1947. It is a subtropical, marine eel which is known from Japan, in the northwestern Pacific Ocean. It inhabits shallow coastal waters. Males can reach a maximum total length of 60 centimetres (2.0 ft).
