= Yirrkala ori =

Scientific classification
- Kingdom: Animalia
- Phylum: Chordata
- Class: Actinopterygii
- Order: Anguilliformes
- Family: Ophichthidae
- Genus: Yirrkala
- Species: Y. ori

Binomial name
- Yirrkala ori McCosker, 2011

Species of fish

Yirrkala ori is an eel in the family Ophichthidae (worm/snake eels). It was described by John E. McCosker in 2011. It is a marine, subtropical eel which is known from South Africa, in the western Indian Ocean. It is known to dwell at a depth of 20 metres (66 ft), and inhabits substrates with coarse sand sediments. Males can reach a maximum total length of 43.8 centimetres (17.2 in), while females can reach a maximum TL of 35.3 centimetres (13.9 in).

The species epithet "ori" consists of the initials of the Oceanographic Research Institute of South Africa, by which the key specimens of the species were collected.
