= Ichthyapus insularis =

Conservation status
- Data Deficient (IUCN 3.1)

Scientific classification
- Kingdom: Animalia
- Phylum: Chordata
- Class: Actinopterygii
- Order: Anguilliformes
- Family: Ophichthidae
- Genus: Ichthyapus
- Species: I. insularis

Binomial name
- Ichthyapus insularis McCosker, 2004

Species of fish

Ichthyapus insularis is an eel in the family Ophichthidae ("snake eels"). It was described by John E. McCosker in 2004. It is a tropical saltwater eel found only around Ascension Island in the southeastern Atlantic Ocean. It is known to dwell at a depth range of 0 to 1 metre (0.0 to 3.3 ft) and lives among rocks and sand. Males can reach a total length of 42.7 centimetres (16.8 in).

The species epithet "insularis", meaning "island" in Latin, refers to Ascension Island, to which I. insularis seems to be endemic.
