= Misol snake eel =

Scientific classification
- Kingdom: Animalia
- Phylum: Chordata
- Class: Actinopterygii
- Division: Teleostei
- Order: Anguilliformes
- Family: Ophichthidae
- Genus: Yirrkala
- Species: Y. misolensis

Binomial name
- Yirrkala misolensis (Günther, 1872)

Synonyms
- Ophichthys misolensis Günther, 1872

Species of fish

The Misol snake eel (Yirrkala misolensis) is a species of eel in the worm/snake eel family Ophichthidae. It was first described by Albert Günther in 1872, originally under the genus Ophichthys. It is a tropical, marine eel which is known from the western central Pacific Ocean.
