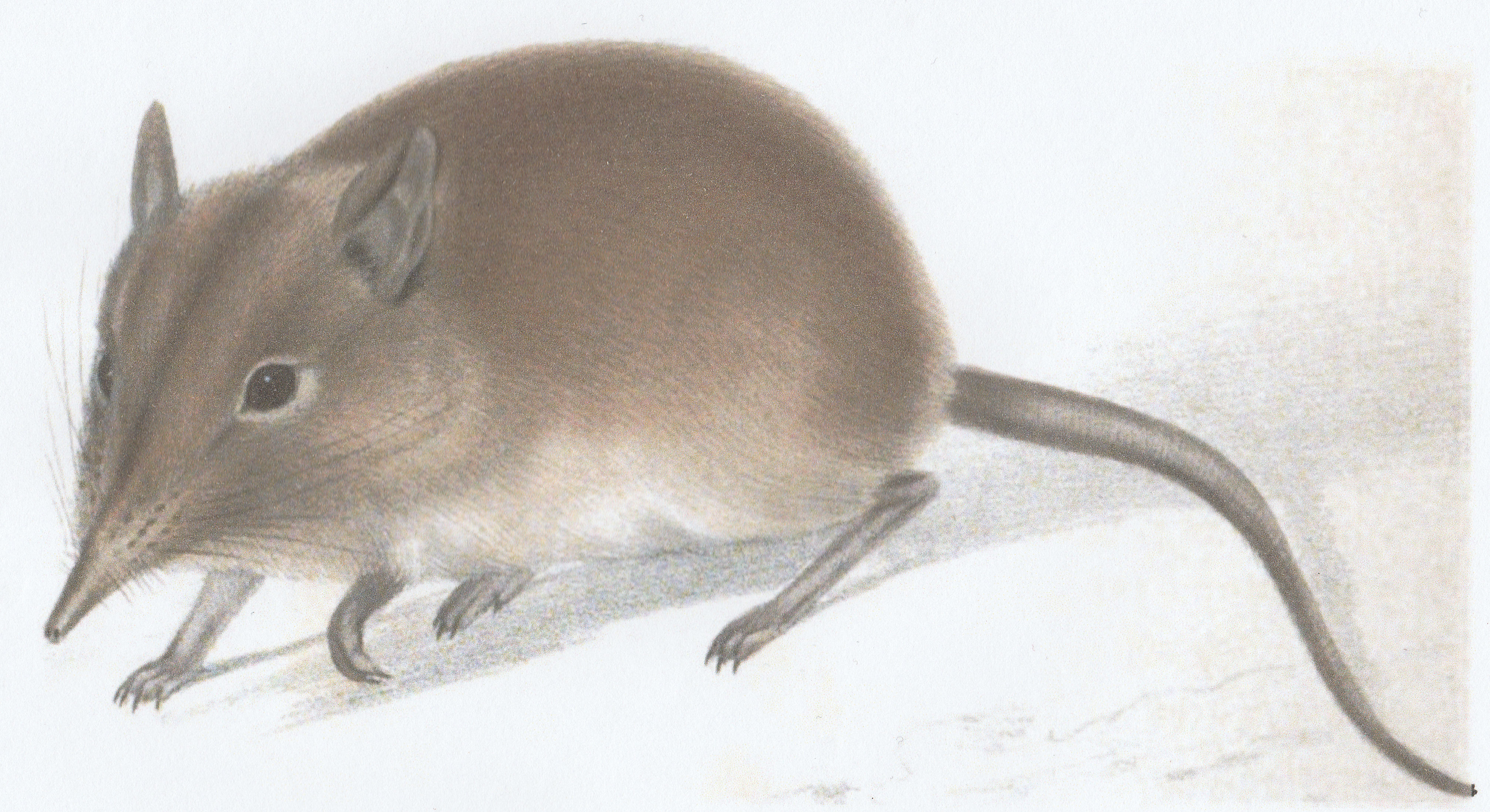

Conservation status
- Least Concern (IUCN 3.1)

Scientific classification
- Kingdom: Animalia
- Phylum: Chordata
- Class: Mammalia
- Infraclass: Placentalia
- Order: Macroscelidea
- Family: Macroscelididae
- Genus: Elephantulus
- Species: E. brachyrhynchus

Binomial name
- Elephantulus brachyrhynchus (A. Smith, 1836)
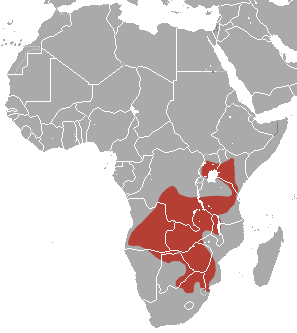
- Short-snouted sengi range

= Short-snouted sengi =

Species of mammal

The short-snouted sengi or short-snouted elephant shrew (Elephantulus brachyrhynchus) is a species of small mammal belonging to the sengi family (Macroscelididae). It is found over a wide area of Africa. Its natural habitats are dry savanna and subtropical or tropical dry lowland grassland.

== Conservation status and threats ==
The short-snouted sengi is listed as of least concern by the IUCN because it inhabits immense areas of southern Africa that are generally not inhabited by humans. While no specific threats to this species are apparent, possible future threats to the short-snouted sengis include woody plant encroachment and desertification.

== Location ==
This species is found from northern South Africa through northeast Namibia, east and central Botswana, Angola, Zimbabwe, Malawi, Zambia and Mozambique north to the Democratic Republic of Congo. In East Africa, they are found in Tanzania, Kenya and Uganda.

== Habitat ==
Short-snouted sengis inhabit arid and semi-arid habitats. They prefer densely covered bush lands and scrub such as dry savannas and grasslands.

== Lifespan ==
While knowledge on the lifespan of short-snouted sengis are limited, one specimen lived 4.2 years in captivity.

== Physical description ==
Short-snouted sengis have an average length of 21 cm (8.3 in) from head to tail and weigh 1.41–2.11 oz (40–60 g) on average. They have varied brown body fur with white, buffy or off-white rings around the eyes and upper lip. They have brownish-yellow patches behind the ears. While they have the long, narrow snout symbolic of sengis, their snouts are shorter than the snouts of other species and a bit tapered. The small size of the short-snouted sengi makes it potential prey for birds of prey, big cats and snakes.

== Reproduction ==
Short-snouted sengis form monogamous relationships and mate for life. Females are able to produce five to six litters per year with a gestation period of 57 to 65 days. Each litter consists of one to two individuals that are born fully furred, open-eyed and able to run almost immediately after birth. Young are 10g when born, and it takes them 50 days to reach adult size. After approximately 15 days, offspring establish their own home ranges.

== Behavior ==
Short-snouted sengis are diurnal with their most active period being early morning. While they are sometimes in pairs, they are mostly solitary animals. They are a fast moving species that scurries from place to place and avoids open areas without cover. Short-snouted sengis exhibit a high degree of territoriality with each sex driving individuals of their own sex out of the pair's territory. They utilize a network of safety burrows by digging their own burrows or stealing pre-existing burrows of rodents.

== Diet ==
Short-snouted sengis are mainly insectivorous. Their primary diet consists of ants, termites, grasshoppers and crickets. However, they are opportunistic foragers and will feed on vegetation, fruits and seeds if necessary.

== Communication ==
Short-snouted sengis communicated through chemical and tactile means. Each short-snouted sengi marks its trails with scent glands located behind its ears. Marking territory serves two purposes for short-snouted sengis: establishing territories and alerting their mate of their location. They often exhibit a behavior called footdrumming, which is rapid tapping of the hind legs. This behavior is exhibited in response to a stressful situation like mating or avoiding a predator.
