= African common toad =

African common toad may refer to:

- Amietophrynus regularis, the African bouncing toad, or common square-marked toad
- Amietophrynus gutturalis, the guttural toad
