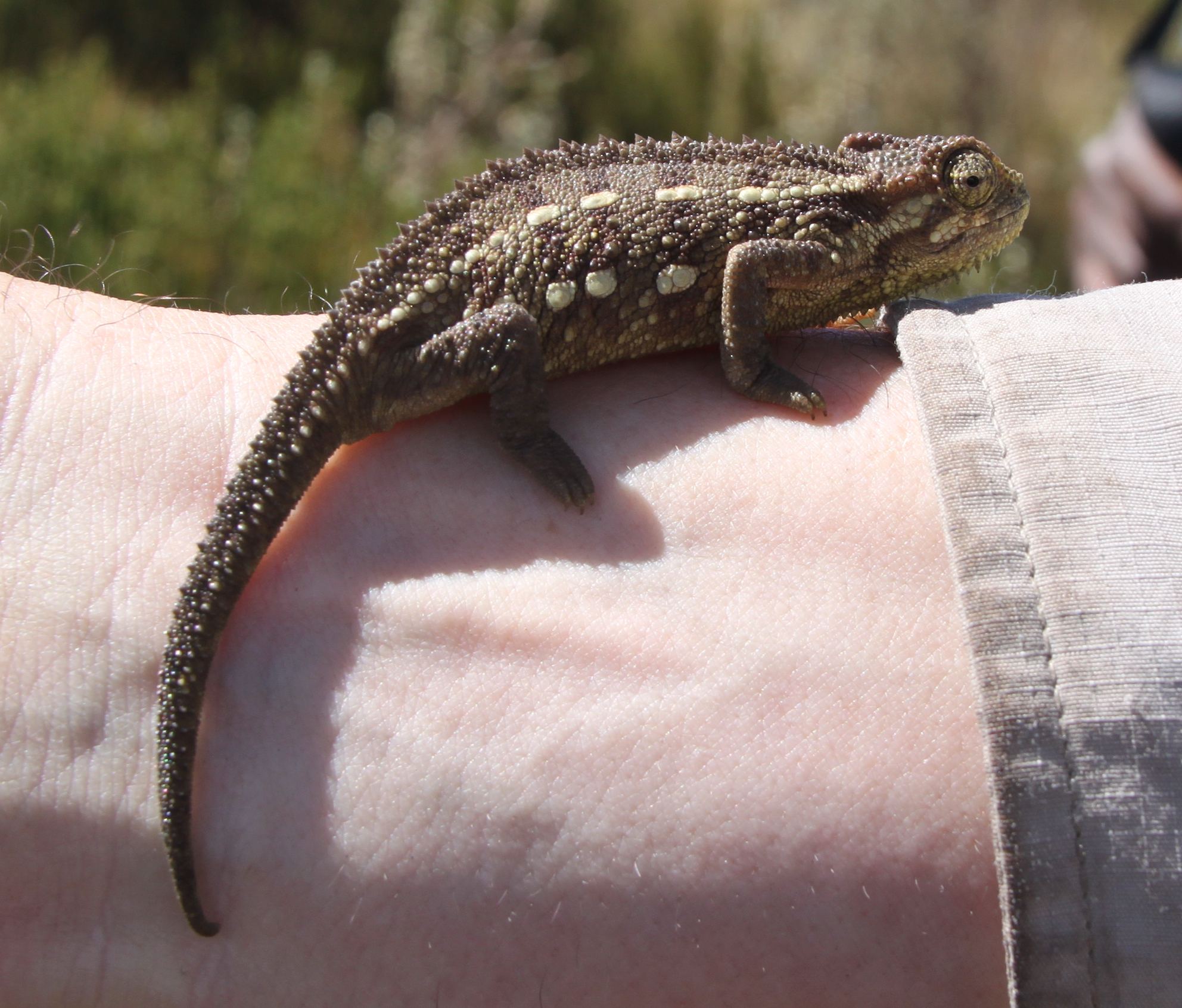

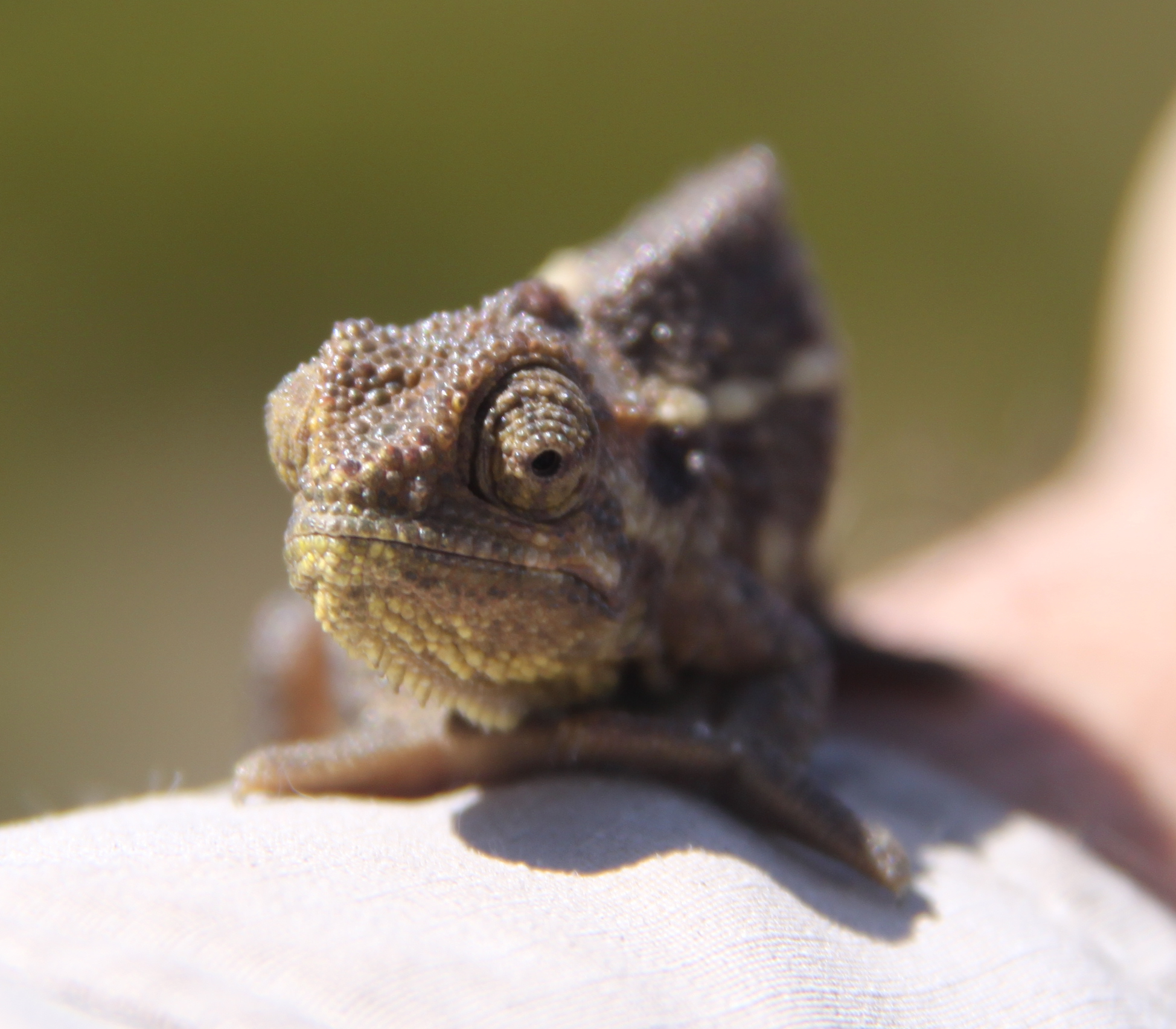

Conservation status
- Least Concern (IUCN 3.1)

Scientific classification
- Kingdom: Animalia
- Phylum: Chordata
- Class: Reptilia
- Order: Squamata
- Suborder: Iguania
- Family: Chamaeleonidae
- Genus: Trioceros
- Species: T. bitaeniatus

Binomial name
- Trioceros bitaeniatus Fischer, 1884

Synonyms
- Chamaeleo bilineatus Severtzov, 1916

= Side-striped chameleon =

Species of lizard

The side-striped chameleon or the two-lined chameleon (Trioceros bitaeniatus) is a chameleon native to Ethiopia, southern Sudan, Somalia, Kenya, Tanzania, Uganda, and the northeastern Democratic Republic of the Congo.

In Kenya, the side-striped chameleon lives on Mount Kenya, Kilimanjaro, and in the Aberdare Range. They live in the Hagenia and Hypericum scrub in the timberline forest between 3000 and 4000 m. It lives between 1 and 2 m (3.3 and 6.6 ft) above the ground in the giant heathers that grow here. They are strictly diurnal and shelter at night between dense bushes.
