= Thin sand-eel =

Scientific classification
- Kingdom: Animalia
- Phylum: Chordata
- Class: Actinopterygii
- Division: Teleostei
- Order: Anguilliformes
- Family: Ophichthidae
- Genus: Yirrkala
- Species: Y. tenuis

Binomial name
- Yirrkala tenuis (Günther, 1870)

Synonyms
- Ophichthys tenuis Günther, 1870; Pantonora tenuis (Günther, 1870); Caecula natalensis Fowler, 1934

Species of fish

The thin sand-eel (Yirrkala tenuis) is a species of eel in the worm/snake eel family Ophichthidae. It was first described by Albert Günther in 1870, originally under the genus Ophichthys. It is a tropical, marine and freshwater eel which is known from the western Indian Ocean, including the Red Sea, South Africa, Mauritius and Réunion. Males can reach a maximum total length of 53 centimetres (21 in).
