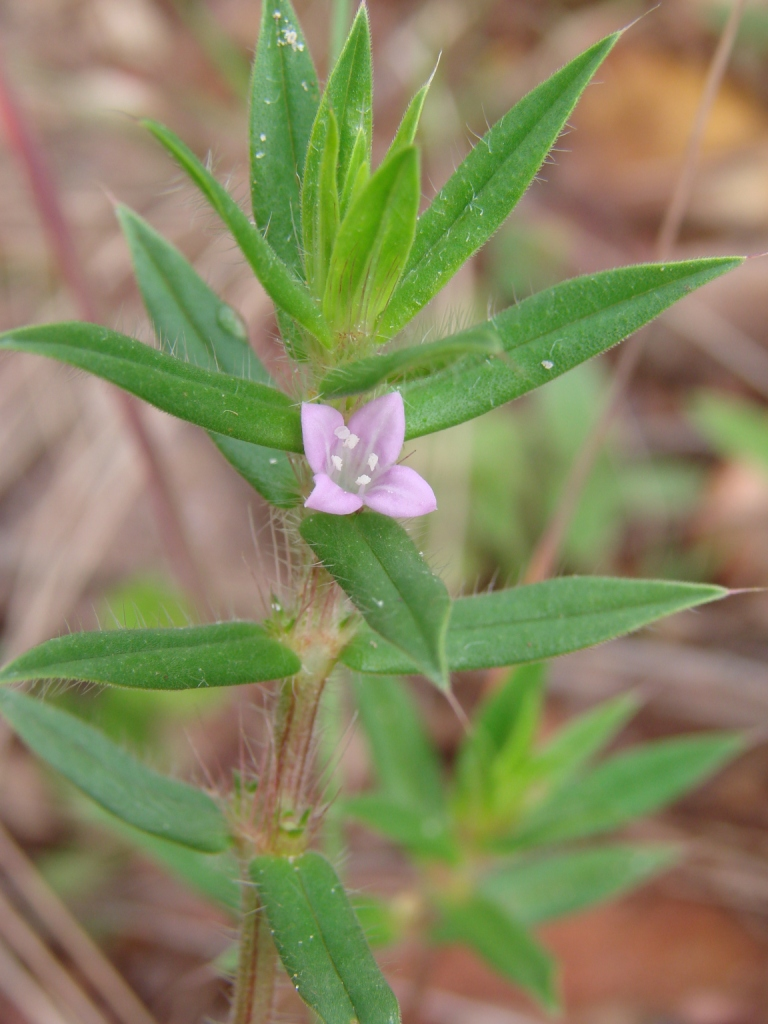
- Hexasepalum teres

Scientific classification
- Kingdom: Plantae
- Clade: Tracheophytes
- Clade: Angiosperms
- Clade: Eudicots
- Clade: Asterids
- Order: Gentianales
- Family: Rubiaceae
- Genus: Hexasepalum; Bartl. ex DC. (1830)

Species
- 15; see text

Synonyms
- Diodella Small (1913); Endopogon Raf. (1837)

= Hexasepalum =

Genus of flowering plants

Hexasepalum is a genus of flowering plants in the family Rubiaceae. It includes 15 species native to the Americas, ranging from the northeastern United States to Bolivia, Paraguay, and southern Brazil, and to tropical Africa.

== Species ==
15 species are accepted:

- Hexasepalum angustifolium Bartl. ex DC.
- Hexasepalum apiculatum (Willd.) Delprete & J.H.Kirkbr.
- Hexasepalum domingense (DC.) Cabaña Fader & R.M.Salas
- Hexasepalum gardneri (K.Schum.) J.H.Kirkbr. & Delprete
- Hexasepalum lippioides (Griseb.) J.H.Kirkbr. & Delprete
- Hexasepalum mello-barretoi (Standl.) J.H.Kirkbr. & Delprete
- Hexasepalum nordestinum Cabaña Fader & E.B.Souza
- Hexasepalum radulum (Willd.) Delprete & J.H.Kirkbr.
- Hexasepalum rosmarinifolium (Pohl ex DC.) Delprete & J.H.Kirkbr.
- Hexasepalum sarmentosum (Sw.) Delprete & J.H.Kirkbr.
- Hexasepalum scandens (Sw.) J.H.Kirkbr. & Delprete
- Hexasepalum serrulatum (P.Beauv.) J.H.Kirkbr. & Delprete
- Hexasepalum teres (Walter) J.H.Kirkbr.
- Hexasepalum vaginale (Benth.) Cabaña Fader & Dessein
- Hexasepalum zappiae E.L.Cabral & Cabaña Fader
