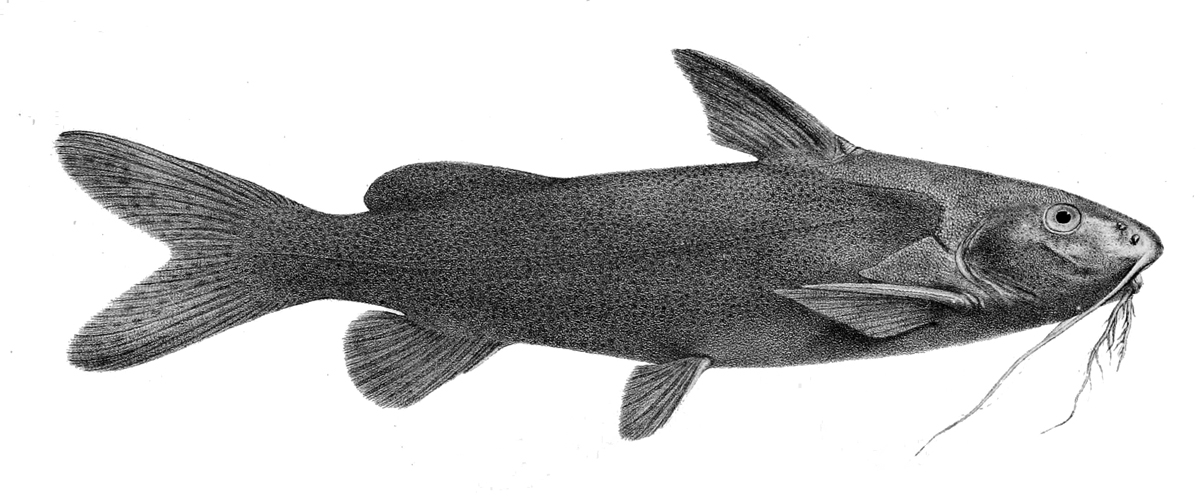

Conservation status
- Least Concern (IUCN 3.1)

Scientific classification
- Domain: Eukaryota
- Kingdom: Animalia
- Phylum: Chordata
- Class: Actinopterygii
- Order: Siluriformes
- Family: Mochokidae
- Genus: Synodontis
- Species: S. schall

Binomial name
- Synodontis schall (Bloch & Schneider, 1801)

Synonyms
- Synodontis gambiensis Günther, 1864

= Synodontis schall =

Species of fish

Synodontis schall, the Wahrindi, is a species of upside-down catfish widespread in northern Africa. This species is in the largest genus of the family Mochokidae. This species grows to a length of 49.0 centimetres (19.3 in) TL.

== Distribution ==
Synodontis schall is a species of catfish found in Africa. It is found mainly in Lake Nubia and is one of the only Synodontis species that have thrived in this lake and have adapted to new conditions, unlike the other species. Synodontis schall is able to adapt to many different kinds of food and habitats, increasing the chances of survival.

== Appearance and anatomy ==
Synodontis schall has a shield on its body and has strong bony spines on the pectoral and dorsal fins. Some areas of new evolutionary forces have allowed for the Synodontis schall to have different phenotypes. Recent studies have found evidence for an increase number of teeth and gill rakers which could possibly point to a change from them being herbivores to carnivores.

The swim bladder of Synodontis schall is whitish in appearance. Its walls are very thick and elastic, with the posterior section being thicker than the front one. The roof of the front section of the swim bladder is directly attached to the backbone and the muscles which are connected to it are able to compress and contract the swim bladder. The grunting sounds created by the swim bladder are most likely made by the vibration of its walls. The sound is a deep grunting sound that can be heard for up to five meters away. The sound starts off sharply and then fades out within one fifth of a second. The fish will produce sounds when it is scared, in pain, when it has aggressive behavior and attacks other fish, and when it's spawning.

== Diet ==
The diet of Synodontis schall is one of macrophytes and algae, which are the two main types of food for them, fish and egg scales, insect larvae, and molluscs. This suggests that they are omnivores.

== Reproduction ==
Not much is known about the reproduction of Synodontis schall. Physical and biological factors can affect the fish as it matures. July to October is the time for spawning for them and an increase in spawning activity occurs when there is a lot of rain.

== Relationship to humans ==
Synodontis schall are very important to Benin, a country in Africa. Fishermen in Africa catch these fish in their nets and so they must break the spines of the fish to get them out of their nets. Synodontis schall can be caught for food or even traded since they are prized fish.
