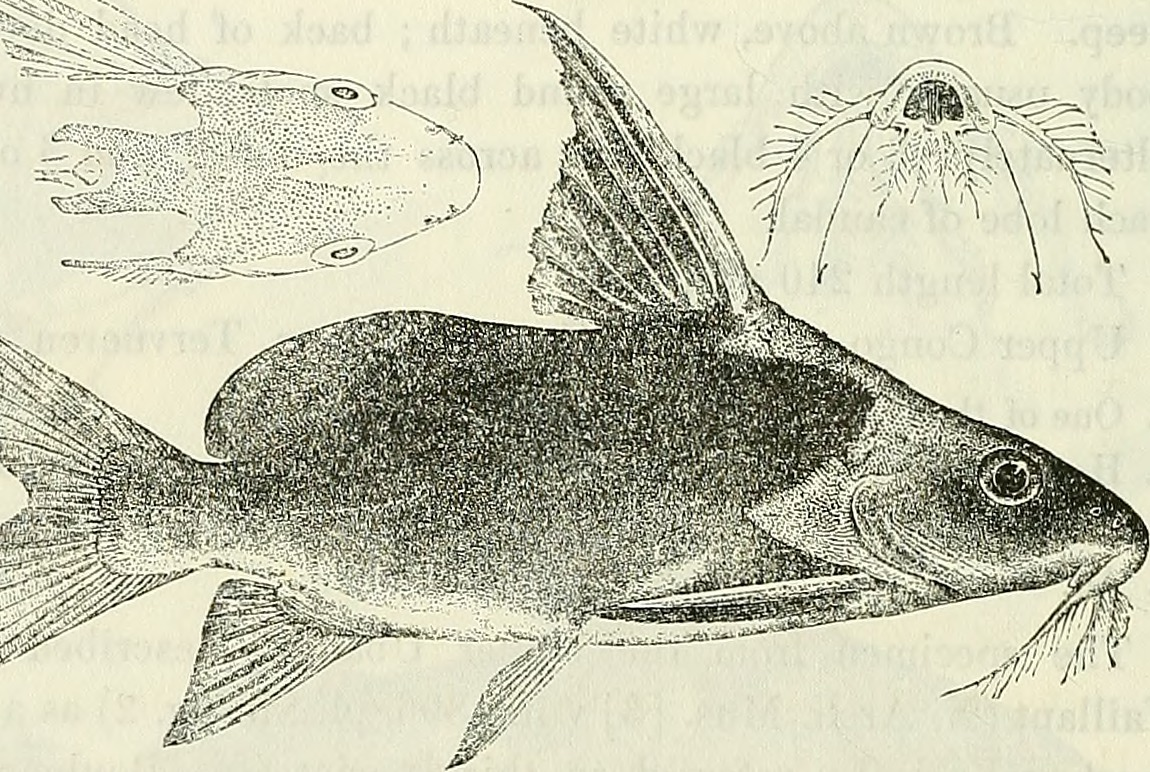

Conservation status
- Least Concern (IUCN 3.1)

Scientific classification
- Kingdom: Animalia
- Phylum: Chordata
- Class: Actinopterygii
- Order: Siluriformes
- Family: Mochokidae
- Genus: Synodontis
- Species: S. clarias

Binomial name
- Synodontis clarias (Linnaeus, 1758)

= Synodontis clarias =

Species of fish

Synodontis clarias, known as the red tailed synodontis, or the mandi, is a species of upside-down catfish that occurs widely in the waters of northern Africa. It was first described by Swedish zoologist Carl Linnaeus in 1758 as Silurus clarias. The original specimens were obtained in Egypt, near Cairo. The meaning of the species name clarias is not certain, but may possibly have been used to mean "bright" or "clear".

== Description ==
Like all members of the genus Synodontis, S. clarias has a strong, bony head capsule that extends back as far as the first spine of the dorsal fin. The head contains a distinct narrow, bony, external protrusion called a humeral process. The shape and size of the humeral process helps to identify the species. In S. clarias, the humeral process is subtriangular, flat, and rough.

The fish has three pairs of barbels. The maxillary barbels are on located on the upper jaw, and two pairs of mandibular barbels are on the lower jaw. The maxillary barbel is straight with long, slender branches, with a broad membrane at the base. It extends about 3/5 to 1 times the length of the head. The outer pair of mandibular barbels is about 1 1/3 times as long as the inner pair, have long, slender branches with secondary branches.

The front edges of the dorsal fins and the pectoral fins of Syntontis species are hardened into stiff spines. In S. clarias, the spine is as long or slightly longer than the head, curved, and serrated on both sides. The remaining portion of the dorsal fin is made up of seven branching rays, terminating in a short filament. The spine of the pectoral fin is shorter than the dorsal spine, and serrated on both sides. The adipose fin is 3 to 4 1/2 times as long as it is deep. The anal fin contains five unbranched and seven to nine branched rays, and is acutely pointed in the front. The tail, or caudal fin, is deeply notched, with the upper lobe longer.

All members of Syndontis have a structure called a premaxillary toothpad, which is located on the very front of the upper jaw of the mouth. This structure contains several rows of short, chisel-shaped teeth. In S. clarias, there are relatively few premaxillary teeth arranged in one, two, or three distinct series. On the lower jaw, or mandible, the teeth of Syndontis are attached to flexible, stalk-like structures and described as "s-shaped" or "hooked". The number of teeth on the mandible is used to differentiate between species; in S. clarias, there are about 6 to 9 teeth on the mandible.

The color of the fish is grey to green on the back, white on the underside. The fins are greyish white and the tail is often tipped with red. Juveniles may have small dark marbling patterns on the body and round dark spots on the ventral, anal, and caudal fins.

The maximum standard length of the species is 36 centimetres (14 in). Generally, females in the genus Synodontis tend to be slightly larger than males of the same age.

== Habitat and behavior ==
In the wild, the species is occurs from Senegal to Ethiopia, and along the entire length of the Nile River. The species is harvested for human consumption. Its habitat is threatened by dams, water depletion, and water pollution. In its natural environment, it is a bottom feeder, feeding on insect larvae, plants, and detritus. The reproductive habits of most of the species of Synodontis are not known, beyond some instances of obtaining egg counts from gravid females. Spawning likely occurs during the flooding season between July and October, and pairs swim in unison during spawning. The growth rate is rapid in the first year, then slows down as the fish age.
