= Vasily Zuyev =

Russian naturalist and traveler

Vasily Fyodorovich Zuyev (Russian: Василий Фёдорович Зуев, 1 (12) January 1754 – 7 (18) January 1794) was a Russian naturalist and traveler, academician of the St. Petersburg Academy of Sciences (1779).

Zuyev participated in the academy's expeditions (1768–74) under the command of Peter Simon Pallas. In 1781–82 he traveled to the region of the Bug and lower Dniepr rivers, which he described in the book Travel Notes From St. Petersburg to Kherson in 1781 and 1782 (1787). He wrote a number of works on zoology, chiefly on the taxonomy of fish. Zuyev was the author of the first Russian manual on natural science, Outline of Natural History (parts 1–2, 1786).

== Taxon described by him ==
- See Category:Taxa named by Vasily Zuyev
