= Caecula =

Scientific classification
- Domain: Eukaryota
- Kingdom: Animalia
- Phylum: Chordata
- Class: Actinopterygii
- Order: Anguilliformes
- Family: Ophichthidae
- Subfamily: Ophichthinae
- Genus: Caecula; Vahl, 1794

Species
- See text.

Genus of fishes

Caecula is a genus of eels in the snake eel family Ophichthidae. It currently contains the following species:

- Caecula kuro (Nagamichi Kuroda, 1947)
- Caecula pterygera Vahl, 1794 (Finny snake-eel)
