= Martin Vahl =

Danish-Norwegian botanist (1749–1804)

Martin Henrichsen Vahl
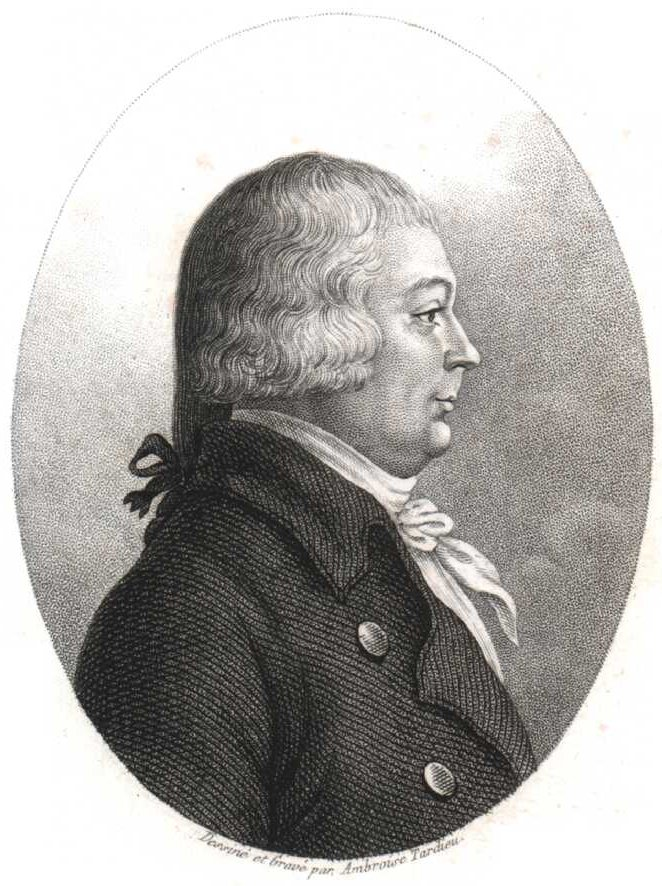
- Born: 10 October 1749; Bergen, Norway
- Died: 24 December 1804 (aged 55); Copenhagen, Denmark
- Occupations: Botanist and zoologist
- Scientific career
- Author abbrev. (botany): Vahl

Martin Henrichsen Vahl (10 October 1749 – 24 December 1804) was a Danish-Norwegian botanist, herbalist and zoologist.

== Biography ==
Martin Vahl was born in Bergen, Norway and attended Bergen Cathedral School. He studied botany at the University of Copenhagen and at Uppsala University under Carl Linnaeus. He edited Flora Danica fasc. XVI-XXI (1787–1799), Symbolæ Botanicæ I-III (1790–1794), Eclogæ Americanæ I-IV (1796–1807) and Enumeratio Plantarum I-II (1804–1805). He lectured at the University of Copenhagen Botanical Garden from 1779 to 1782.

Vahl made several research trips in Europe and North Africa between 1783 and 1788. He became professor at the Society for Natural History at the University of Copenhagen in 1786 and was a full professor of botany from 1801 to his death. In 1792, he was elected a foreign member of the Royal Swedish Academy of Sciences. He died in Copenhagen, Denmark at age 55. His son Jens Vahl also became a botanist.

== Authority name ==
This botanist is denoted by the author abbreviation Vahl when citing a botanical name.

== Other sources ==
- Christensen, Carl (1932) Martin Vahl, pp. 85–88 in: Meisen, V. Prominent Danish Scientists through the Ages. University Library of Copenhagen 450th Anniversary. Levin & Munksgaard, Copenhagen.
