= List of amphibians of Ghana =

This is a list of the amphibian species recorded in Ghana. There are 80 amphibian species in Ghana, of which 2 are critically endangered, 6 are endangered, 4 are vulnerable and 10 are near-threatened. This list is derived from the Amphibiaweb Database & IUCN Redlist which lists species of amphibians and includes those amphibians that have recently been classified as extinct (since 1500 AD). The taxonomy and naming of the individual species is based on those currently used by the Amphibiaweb Database & IUCN Redlist as of 23 September 2011 and supplemented by the Common Names and taxonomy from the IUCN & Wikipedia where no Amphibiaweb article was available.

The following tags are used to highlight specific species' conservation status as assessed by the IUCN:

EX	Extinct	No reasonable doubt that the last individual has died.
EW	Extinct in the wild	Known only to survive in captivity or as a naturalized populations well outside its previous range.
CR	Critically Endangered	The species is in imminent risk of extinction in the wild.
EN	Endangered	The species is facing an extremely high risk of extinction in the wild.
VU	Vulnerable	The species is facing a high risk of extinction in the wild.
NT	Near Threatened	The species does not meet any of the criteria that would categorise it as risking extinction but it is likely to do so in the future.
LC	Least Concern	There are no current identifiable risks to the species.
DD	Data Deficient	There is inadequate information to make an assessment of the risks to this species.

== Order: Anura (Frogs & Toads) ==
- Sub-order: Mesobatrachia
  - Family: Pipidae
    - Genus: Xenopus
      - Muller's Platanna Xenopus muelleri LC
      - Tropical Clawed Frog Xenopus tropicalis LC
- Sub-order: Neobatrachia
  - Family: Arthroleptidae
    - Genus: Arthroleptis
      - Arthroleptis krokosua EN
      - Mottled Squeaker Arthroleptis poecilonotus LC
      - Buea Screeching Frog Arthroleptis variabilis LC
      - Zimmer's Screeching Frog Arthroleptis zimmeri DD
    - Genus: Cardioglossa
      - Silver Long-fingered Frog Cardioglossa leucomystax LC
      - Cardioglossa occidentalis LC
    - Genus: Leptopelis
      - Savannah Forest Treefrog Leptopelis bufonides LC
      - Amani Forest Tree Frog Leptopelis macrotis NT
      - Tai Forest Treefrog Leptopelis occidentalis NT
      - Leptopelis spiritusnoctis LC
      - Rusty Forest Treefrog Leptopelis viridis LC
  - Family: Bufonidae
    - Genus: Amietophrynus
      - Flat-backed Toad Amietophrynus maculatus LC
      - Common African Toad Amietophrynus regularis LC
      - African Giant Toad Amietophrynus superciliaris LC
      - Togo Toad Amietophrynus togoensis NT
    - Genus: Bufo
      - Penton's Toad Bufo pentoni LC
  - Family: Hemisotidae
    - Genus: Hemisus
      - Guinea Shovelnose Frog Hemisus guineensis LC
      - Marbled Shovelnose Frog Hemisus marmoratus LC
  - Family: Hyperoliidae
    - Genus: Acanthixalus
      - African Wart Frog Acanthixalus sonjae NT
    - Genus: Afrixalus
      - Brown Banana Frog Afrixalus dorsalis LC
      - Banded Banana Frog Afrixalus fulvovittatus LC
      - Nigerian Banana Frog Afrixalus nigeriensis NT
      - Afrixalus vibekensis NT
      - Savanna Banana Frog Afrixalus vittiger LC
      - Weidholz's Banana Frog Afrixalus weidholzi LC
    - Genus: Hyperolius
      - Baumann's Reed Frog Hyperolius baumanni LC
      - Bobiri Reed Frog Hyperolius bobirensis EN
      - Hyperolius concolor LC
      - Lime Reed Frog Hyperolius fusciventris LC
      - Dotted Reed Frog Hyperolius guttulatus LC
      - Hyperolius igbettensis LC
      - Schiotz's Reed Frog Hyperolius laurenti VU
      - Hyperolius nitidulus LC
      - Hyperolius picturatus LC
      - Hyperolius sylvaticus LC
      - Ukami Reed Frog Hyperolius torrentis EN
      - Stream Reed Frog Hyperolius viridigulosus VU
    - Genus: Kassina
      - Ivory Coast Running Frog Kassina arboricola VU
      - Silver Running Frog Kassina cassinoides LC
      - Cochran's Running Frog Kassina cochranae NT
      - Brown Running Frog Kassina fusca LC
      - Senegal Running Frog Kassina senegalensis LC
    - Genus: Phlyctimantis
      - Phlyctimantis boulengeri LC
  - Family: Microhylidae
    - Genus: Phrynomantis
      - West African Rubber Frog Phrynomantis microps LC
  - Family: Ranidae
    - Genus: Hylarana
      - Hylarana albolabris LC
      - Galam White-lipped Frog Hylarana galamensis LC
      - Ivory Coast Frog Hylarana occidentalis EN
    - Genus: Aubria
      - Aubria occidentalis LC
    - Genus: Chiromantis
      - African Foam Nest Frog Chiromantis rufescens LC
    - Genus: Conraua
      - Togo Slippery Frog Conraua derooi CR
    - Genus: Hildebrandtia
      - Ornate Frog Hildebrandtia ornata LC
    - Genus: Hoplobatrachus
      - Crowned Bullfrog Hoplobatrachus occipitalis LC
    - Genus: Phrynobatrachus
      - Phrynobatrachus albolabris DD
      - Allen's River Frog Phrynobatrachus alleni NT
      - Ringed River Frog Phrynobatrachus annulatus EN
      - Boutry River Frog Phrynobatrachus calcaratus LC
      - Phrynobatrachus francisci LC
      - Ghana River Frog Phrynobatrachus ghanensis EN
      - Chabanaud's River Frog Phrynobatrachus gutturosus LC
      - Phrynobatrachus intermedius CR
      - Ahl's River Frog Phrynobatrachus latifrons LC
      - Phrynobatrachus liberiensis NT
      - Natal Puddle Frog Phrynobatrachus natalensis LC
      - Coast River Frog Phrynobatrachus plicatus LC
      - Phrynobatrachus tokba LC
      - Yapo River Frog Phrynobatrachus villiersi VU
      - Phrynobatrachus vogti DD
    - Genus: Ptychadena
      - Victoria Grassland Frog Ptychadena aequiplicata LC
      - Broad-banded Grassland Frog Ptychadena bibroni LC
      - Ptychadena longirostris LC
      - Mascarene Ridged Frog Ptychadena mascareniensis LC
      - Sharp-nosed Ridged FrogPtychadena oxyrhynchus LC
      - Schilluk Ridged Frog Ptychadena schillukorum LC
      - Uganda Grassland Frog Ptychadena stenocephala LC
      - Ptychadena superciliaris NT
      - Central Grassland Frog Ptychadena tellinii LC
      - Dakar Grassland Frog Ptychadena trinodis LC

== Order: Gymnophiona (Caecilian) ==
- Family: Dermophiidae (Caecilian)
  - Genus: Geotrypetes
    - Geotrypetes seraphini LC

== See also ==
- List of chordate orders
- Lists of amphibians by region
