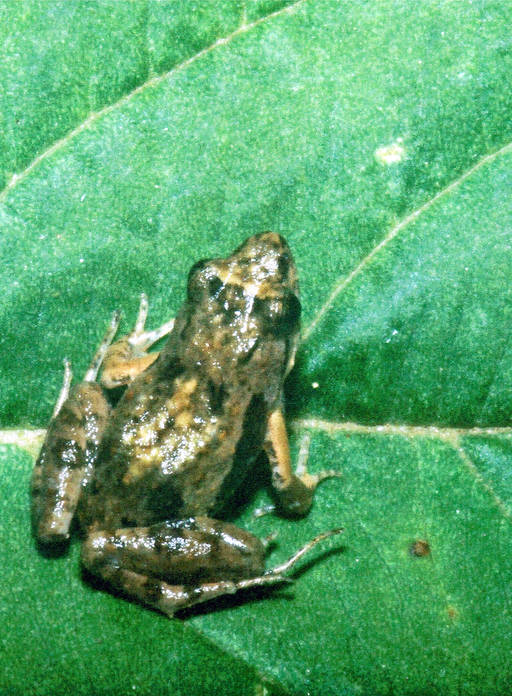

Conservation status
- Least Concern (IUCN 3.1)

Scientific classification
- Kingdom: Animalia
- Phylum: Chordata
- Class: Amphibia
- Order: Anura
- Family: Phrynobatrachidae
- Genus: Phrynobatrachus
- Species: P. parvulus

Binomial name
- Phrynobatrachus parvulus (Boulenger, 1905)

Synonyms
- Arthroleptis parvulus Boulenger, 1905; Arthroleptis schoutedeni de Witte, 1921; Pararthroleptis schoutedeni – Ahl, 1925 "1923"; Phrynobatrachus (Pararthroleptis) schoutedeni – Laurent, 1941; Phrynobatrachus (Pararthroleptis) parvulus – Laurent, 1941; Phrynobatrachus ukingensis nyikae Loveridge, 1953

= Phrynobatrachus parvulus =

Species of frog

Phrynobatrachus parvulus is a species of frog in the family Phrynobatrachidae. It is widely distributed in the upland areas of Central and East Africa in Angola, northern Botswana, northern Zimbabwe, Zambia, southeastern Democratic Republic of the Congo, Malawi, and Tanzania. However, many identifications are problematic, and the taxonomic status of this species with respect to Phrynobatrachus mababiensis and P. ukingensis requires clarification; in the more inclusive species delimitation applied by the IUCN SSC Amphibian Specialist Group, also Uganda is tentatively included in the range of this species. Common names Loanda river frog, dwarf puddle frog, and little puddle frog have been proposed for this species.

== Description ==
In the material from the Upemba National Park (Democratic Republic of the Congo), adult males measure 12–20 mm (0.5–0.8 in) and adult females 13–25 mm (0.5–1.0 in) in snout–vent length. The snout is somewhat flattened and pointed. The tympanum is present but usually not visible through the skin. The limbs are relatively short, the digits lack terminal discs and the toes are partially webbed. Coloration is generally dark brown above and paler beneath with dark brown spots. A distinct silvery stripe is present under the tympanum. A light vertebral stripe is often present. Some specimens are uniform gray above, contrasting with the darker flanks. Throat of females is mottled with dark brown while that of mature males is finely and densely punctated with black. Males have a subgular vocal sac that is usually unpigmented.

== Habitat and conservation ==
Phrynobatrachus parvulus occurs in humid savannas and grasslands (including montane ones), sometimes penetrating montane forest, at elevations mostly above 1,000 m (3,300 ft), and probably to at least 2,000 m (6,600 ft) above sea level. It also adapts to living in agricultural land, including in rice paddies. Breeding takes place in grassy pools, puddles, and marshes. In suitable habitats P. parvulus is an abundant species. It is not facing any significant threats and occurs in many protected areas.
