= Phrynobatrachus elberti =

Conservation status
- Data Deficient (IUCN 3.1)

Scientific classification
- Kingdom: Animalia
- Phylum: Chordata
- Class: Amphibia
- Order: Anura
- Family: Phrynobatrachidae
- Genus: Phrynobatrachus
- Species: P. elberti

Binomial name
- Phrynobatrachus elberti (Ahl, 1925)

Synonyms
- Hylarthroleptis elberti Ahl, 1925 "1923"

Species of frog

Phrynobatrachus elberti is a species of frog in the family Phrynobatrachidae. It is endemic to the Central African Republic and only known from its type locality, Bouala (originally spelled "Buala"), at 998 m (3,274 ft) above sea level on the Ouham River. The specific name elberti honours Johannes Elbert, a German naturalist who visited Kamerun in 1914. Common name Elbert's river frog has been coined for this species.

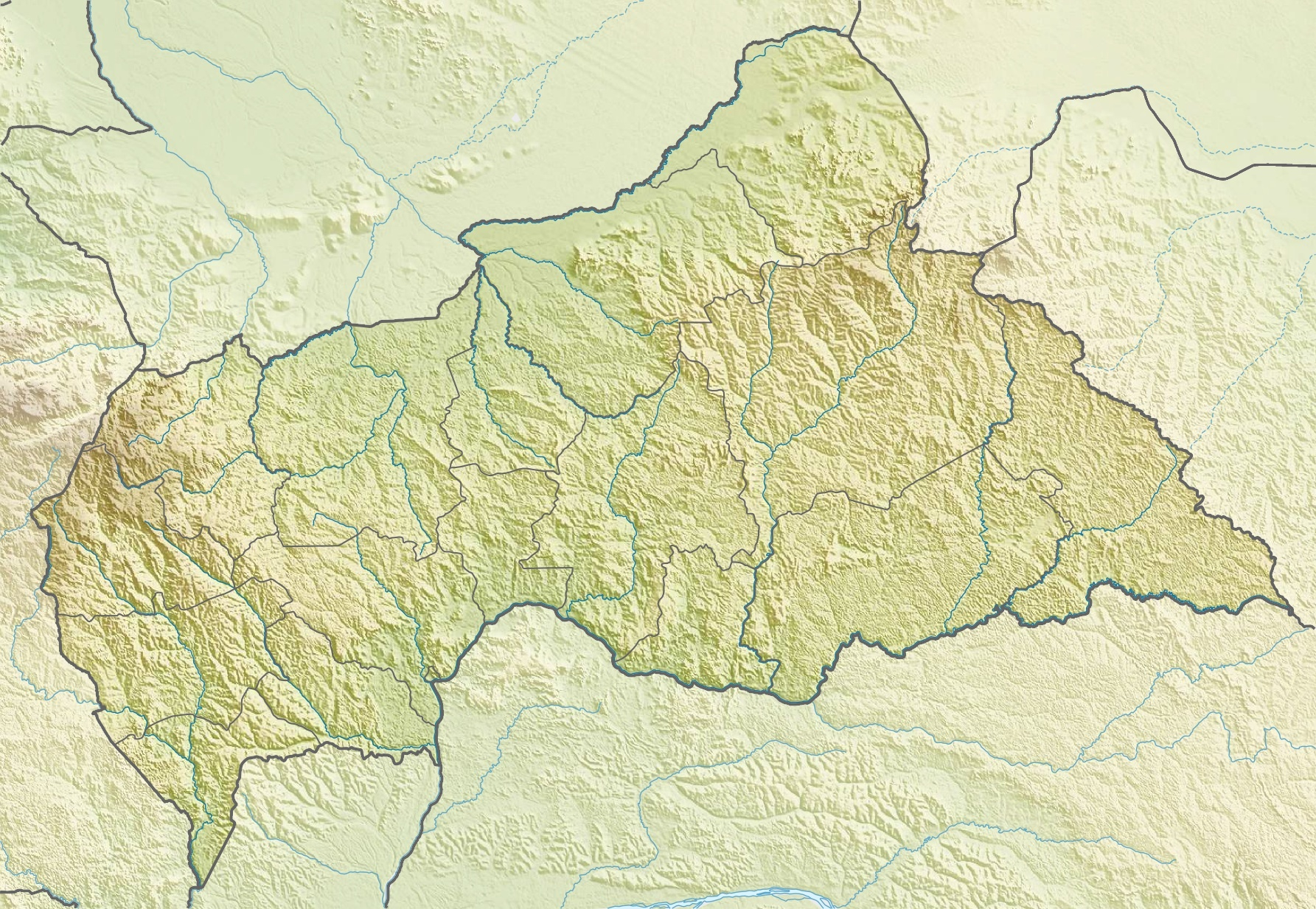
Phrynobatrachus elberti is only known from the holotype collected from Bouala in the Central African Republic

== Taxonomy ==
Phrynobatrachus elberti was described as Hylarthroleptis elberti by German zoologist Ernst Ahl in 1925 based on seventeen syntypes. It was transferred to Phrynobatrachus in 1938 by Kurt Deckert. There are doubts about its taxonomic validity.

== Description ==
Phrynobatrachus elberti resembles Phrynobatrachus graueri and Phrynobatrachus brongersmai, but has interorbital space that is about twice as wide as the upper eyelid.

== Ecology ==
There are no observations of this species after its discovery, and its ecology is essentially unknown.
