= Phrynobatrachus petropedetoides =

Conservation status
- Data Deficient (IUCN 3.1)

Scientific classification
- Kingdom: Animalia
- Phylum: Chordata
- Class: Amphibia
- Order: Anura
- Family: Phrynobatrachidae
- Genus: Phrynobatrachus
- Species: P. petropedetoides

Binomial name
- Phrynobatrachus petropedetoides Ahl, 1924

Species of frog

Phrynobatrachus petropedetoides, the Ruwenzori river frog or Ruwenzori puddle frog, is a species of frog in the family Phrynobatrachidae. It is found in the eastern Democratic Republic of the Congo, southwestern Uganda, and extreme western Tanzania, although its precise distribution is uncertain. It has been treated as a junior synonym of Phrynobatrachus dendrobates, but is currently treated as a valid species.

Phrynobatrachus petropedetoides occurs in montane forest, usually above 900 m (3,000 ft) of elevation. Breeding presumably takes place in water.

This species is threatened by habitat loss (deforestation) caused by agricultural activities, wood extraction, and the expansion of human settlements. Mining is also a potential threat. It is present the Itombwe Natural Reserve, although this does not offer sufficient protection.
