= Phrynobatrachus brevipalmatus =

Conservation status
- Data Deficient (IUCN 3.1)

Scientific classification
- Kingdom: Animalia
- Phylum: Chordata
- Class: Amphibia
- Order: Anura
- Family: Phrynobatrachidae
- Genus: Phrynobatrachus
- Species: P. brevipalmatus

Binomial name
- Phrynobatrachus brevipalmatus (Ahl, 1925)

Species of frog

Phrynobatrachus brevipalmatus is a species of frog in the family Phrynobatrachidae. It is endemic to Angola. Its natural habitats are freshwater marshes and intermittent freshwater marshes.
