= Phrynobatrachus pygmaeus =

Conservation status
- Data Deficient (IUCN 3.1)

Scientific classification
- Kingdom: Animalia
- Phylum: Chordata
- Class: Amphibia
- Order: Anura
- Family: Phrynobatrachidae
- Genus: Phrynobatrachus
- Species: P. pygmaeus

Binomial name
- Phrynobatrachus pygmaeus (Ahl, 1925)

Synonyms
- Arthroleptis pygmaeus Ahl, 1925 "1923"; Micrarthroleptis pygmaeus (Ahl, 1925)

Species of frog

Phrynobatrachus pygmaeus is a species of frog in the family Phrynobatrachidae. It is endemic to the Central African Republic and is only known from its type locality, Bouala (originally spelled "Buala"), at 998 m (3,274 ft) above sea level on the Ouham River. Common name Chad river frog has been coined for this species. This name presumably reflects the earlier assumption that the type locality was in Chad, into which the Ouham River flows.

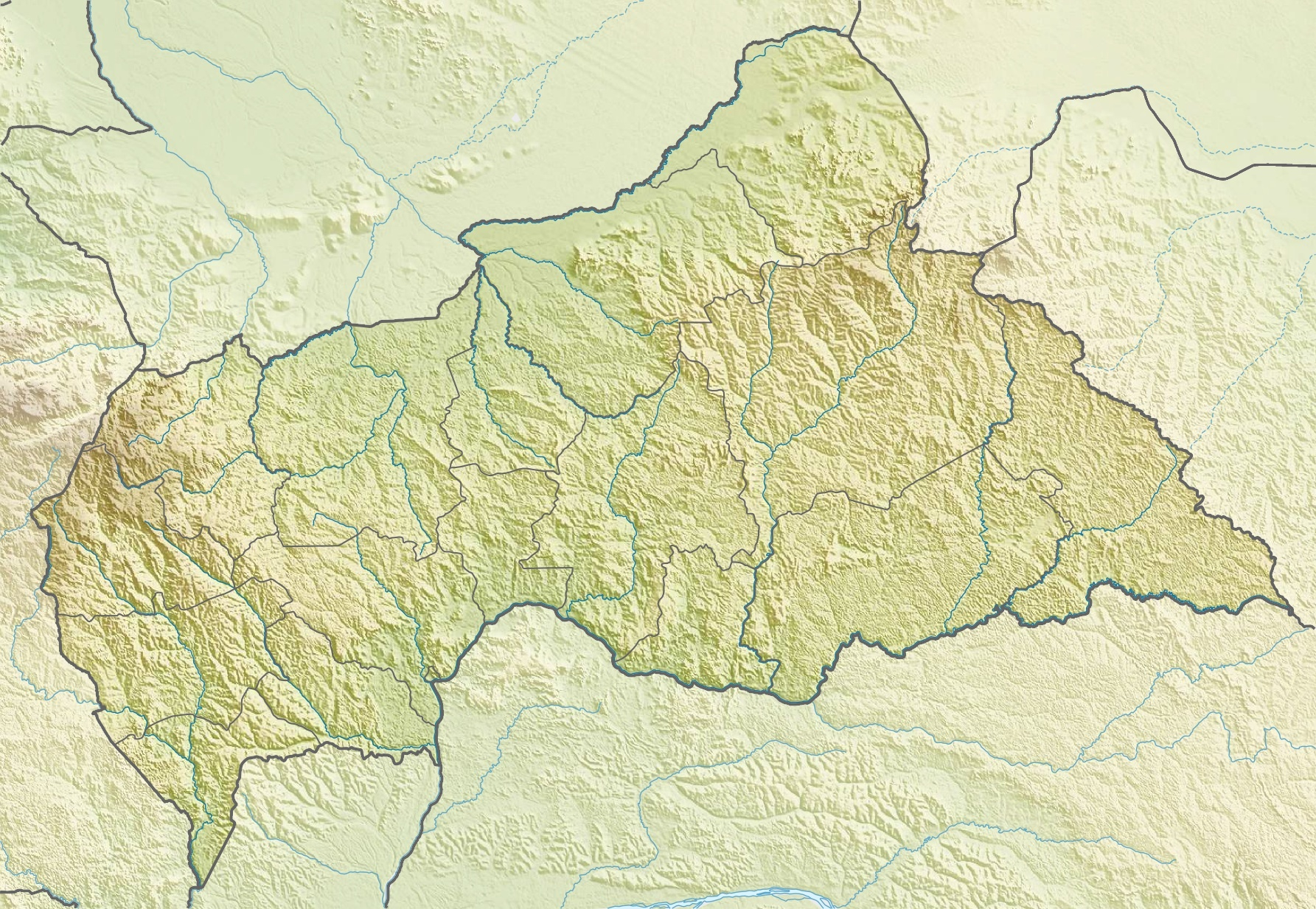
Phrynobatrachus pygmaeus is only known from the holotype collected from Bouala in the Central African Republic

== Etymology ==
Presumably, this species is named for the Latin pygmaeus, meaning "dwarfish".

== Taxonomy ==
Phrynobatrachus pygmaeus was described by German zoologist Ernst Ahl in 1925 based a single specimen, the holotype. Phrynobatrachus pygmaeus is the type species of the genus Micrarthroleptis erected in 1938 by Kurt Deckert. However, the genus is currently considered a synonym of Phrynobatrachus.

== Description ==
Phrynobatrachus pygmaeus has tympanum that is indistinct. Dorsal skin is warty and has two X-shaped ridges in the scapular region.

== Ecology ==
There are no observations of this species after its discovery, and its ecology is essentially unknown.
