= Phrynobatrachus albifer =

Conservation status
- Data Deficient (IUCN 3.1)

Scientific classification
- Kingdom: Animalia
- Phylum: Chordata
- Class: Amphibia
- Order: Anura
- Family: Phrynobatrachidae
- Genus: Phrynobatrachus
- Species: P. albifer

Binomial name
- Phrynobatrachus albifer Ahl, 1924

Synonyms
- Pseudarthroleptis albifer Deckert, 1938

Species of amphibian

Phrynobatrachus albifer is a species of frog native to Tanzania. It lives near inland fresh water bodies.
