= Phrynobatrachus congicus =

Conservation status
- Data Deficient (IUCN 3.1)

Scientific classification
- Kingdom: Animalia
- Phylum: Chordata
- Class: Amphibia
- Order: Anura
- Family: Phrynobatrachidae
- Genus: Phrynobatrachus
- Species: P. congicus

Binomial name
- Phrynobatrachus congicus (Ahl, 1925)

Synonyms
- Hylarthroleptis congicus Ahl, 1925 "1923"; Arthrolepis congicus (Ahl, 1925)

Species of amphibian

Phrynobatrachus congicus is a poorly known species of frog in the family Phrynobatrachidae. It might be endemic to Democratic Republic of the Congo—it is only known from its unspecific type locality "Congo", which presumably corresponds to the modern-day Democratic Republic of the Congo. The specific name congicus attests to its origins: the Latin suffix -icus is meaning "to belong to". Common name Congo river frog has been coined for this species.

== Taxonomy and systematics ==
Phrynobatrachus congicus was described in 1925 by Ernst Ahl as Hylarthroleptis congicus. The taxonomic status of this species is unclear. It has not been included in recent molecular studies, so its closest relatives are not known.

== Habitat and conservation ==
Habitat requirements of this species are poorly known. It is probably similar to other species in the genus, and breedings takes place in water. Its population and conservation status are unknown.
