= Phrynobatrachus nanus =

Conservation status
- Data Deficient (IUCN 3.1)

Scientific classification
- Kingdom: Animalia
- Phylum: Chordata
- Class: Amphibia
- Order: Anura
- Family: Phrynobatrachidae
- Genus: Phrynobatrachus
- Species: P. nanus

Binomial name
- Phrynobatrachus nanus (Ahl, 1925)

Synonyms
- Pararthroleptis nanus Ahl, 1925 "1923"; Arthroleptis nanus (Ahl, 1925)

Species of frog

Phrynobatrachus nanus is a species of frog in the family Phrynobatrachidae. It is endemic to the Central African Republic and is only known from its type locality, Bouala (originally spelled "Buala"), at 998 m (3,274 ft) above sea level on the Ouham River. Common name Buala river frog has been coined for this species.

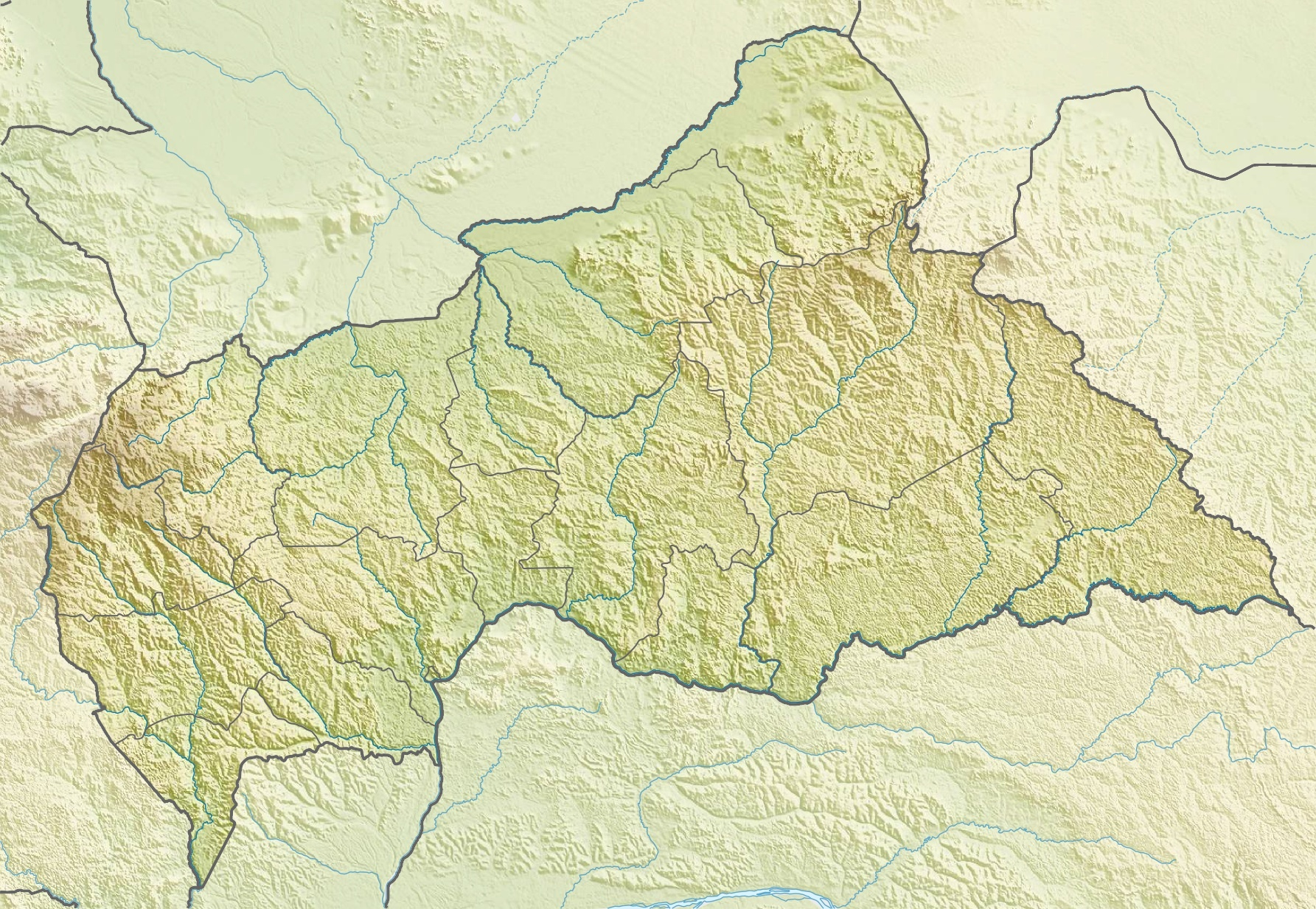
Phrynobatrachus nanus is only known from the holotype collected from Bouala in the Central African Republic

== Taxonomy ==
Phrynobatrachus nanus was described by German zoologist Ernst Ahl in 1925 as Pararthroleptis nanus based a single specimen, the holotype. Phrynobatrachus nanus is the type species of the genus Pararthroleptis Ahl, 1925 "1923". However, the genus is currently considered a synonym of Phrynobatrachus.

== Description ==
Phrynobatrachus nanus has an indistinct tympanum. There are two metatarsal tubercles. The dorsum is olive-brownish and has six to eight greyish flecks, about as large as the eye. The thighs have three or four bands.

== Ecology ==
There are no observations of this species after its discovery, and its ecology is essentially unknown.
