= Phrynobatrachus steindachneri =

Conservation status
- Critically Endangered (IUCN 3.1)

Scientific classification
- Kingdom: Animalia
- Phylum: Chordata
- Class: Amphibia
- Order: Anura
- Family: Phrynobatrachidae
- Genus: Phrynobatrachus
- Species: P. steindachneri

Binomial name
- Phrynobatrachus steindachneri Nieden, 1910

Species of frog

Phrynobatrachus steindachneri is a species of frog in the family Phrynobatrachidae. It is found in western Cameroon and eastern Nigeria. The specific name steindachneri honours Franz Steindachner, an Austrian herpetologist and ichthyologist. This species is also known as Steindachner's puddle frog and Steindachner's river frog.

== Taxonomy and systematics ==
Phrynobatrachus steindachneri forms, together with Phrynobatrachus jimzimkusi and Phrynobatrachus njiomock described in 2013, so-called "Phrynobatrachus steindachneri complex". Even after identifying the latter lineages as distinct species, Phrynobatrachus steindachneri shows large genetic differences and could contain more than one species.

== Description ==
Phrynobatrachus steindachneri measure 16–37 mm (0.6–1.5 in) in snout–vent length. The body is compact with very strong limbs. The head is longer than it is broad. The canthus rostralis is sharp. The tympanum is distinct. The fingers and the toes are slim with small but distinct discs. The toes are extensively webbed. Skin is smooth or may have very small asperities. The dorsum is grey-green or olive-brown; some individuals appear veined or mottled. The hindlimbs have dark crossbars. The ventrum is white with brown or blackish mottling. The limbs are ventrally yellowish. Males have a subgular vocal sac.

== Habitat and conservation ==
Phrynobatrachus steindachneri occurs in montane forests, forest strips, and montane grassland at elevations of 1,300–2,100 m (4,300–6,900 ft) above sea level. It is associated with slow-flowing watercourses and can occur in very open (disturbed) situations. Breed takes place in still water and marshes.

This species was previously (until about 2009) one of the most common species found in the mountains, but has strongly declined in later years. Although the reasons of this decline are not known, it is similar to declines associated with chytridiomycosis. Other threats include ongoing loss of forest and the degradation of montane grassland caused by to agricultural expansion, wood extraction, and expanding human settlements.
