= Phrynobatrachus sternfeldi =

Conservation status
- Data Deficient (IUCN 3.1)

Scientific classification
- Kingdom: Animalia
- Phylum: Chordata
- Class: Amphibia
- Order: Anura
- Family: Phrynobatrachidae
- Genus: Phrynobatrachus
- Species: P. sternfeldi

Binomial name
- Phrynobatrachus sternfeldi (Ahl, 1924)

Synonyms
- Arthroleptis taeniatus Sternfeld, 1917 — junior homonym of Arthroleptis taeniatus Boulenger, 1906; Arthroleptis sternfeldi Ahl, 1924 — replacement name

Species of frog

Phrynobatrachus sternfeldi is a species of frog in the family Phrynobatrachidae. It is endemic to Central African Republic and only known from its type locality, "Fort Crampel". The specific name sternfeldi honours Richard Sternfeld, a German zoologist and herpetologist. Common name Sternfeld's river frog has been coined for this species.

There is no observations of this species after its discovery, and its ecology is essentially unknown.
