= Phrynobatrachus parkeri =

Conservation status
- Least Concern (IUCN 3.1)

Scientific classification
- Kingdom: Animalia
- Phylum: Chordata
- Class: Amphibia
- Order: Anura
- Family: Phrynobatrachidae
- Genus: Phrynobatrachus
- Species: P. parkeri

Binomial name
- Phrynobatrachus parkeri de Witte, 1933

Species of frog

Phrynobatrachus parkeri is a species of frog in the family Phrynobatrachidae. It is endemic to the west-central and northeastern Democratic Republic of the Congo. It is only known from a few widely separated localities. It is similar to Phrynobatrachus acridoides (Cope, 1867), and it might be a synonym of the latter. The specific name parkeri honors Hampton Wildman Parker, an English zoologist and herpetologist. Common name Parker's river frog has been coined for it.

== Description ==
Adult males measure 18–24 mm (0.7–0.9 in) and adult females 19–26 mm (0.7–1.0 in) in snout–vent length. The head is longer than it is broad, but the snout is short. The tympanum is present but may be obscured by skin. The toe tips are dilated into small but distinct, round discs. The toes are moderately webbed, distinguishing it from the more extensively webbed Phrynobatrachus acridoides. There is a pair of concave ridges on the anterior part of the dorsum. Coloration is polymorphic. One form is dorsally dark greyish brown, usually with black areas overlying the dermal ridges. The second color morph is otherwise similar but has a narrow yellow or orange vertebral stripe superimposed on the previous pattern. The third morph has a reddish brown dorsum, edged with a black line and grayish brown sides. Most individuals have a narrow oblique stripe on the rear of the thigh. All individuals have whitish bellies, and males may have a grey or black throat. Mature males have a subgular vocal sac, grey nuptials pads, and many tiny spinules on the throat and the chest.

== Habitat and conservation ==
Phrynobatrachus parkeri occurs in grassy and shrubby savanna and in gallery forests. In the Garamba National Park, the majority (two thirds) of individuals were found in wet environments (marshes, springs, ponds, streams). Breeding probably takes place throughout the wet season. Males call at all times of the day, often from very small pools.

This is a poorly known species. It was abundant in the Garamba National Park. It is believed to be adaptable and not to face significant threats.
