= Phrynobatrachus hylaios =

Conservation status
- Least Concern (IUCN 3.1)

Scientific classification
- Kingdom: Animalia
- Phylum: Chordata
- Class: Amphibia
- Order: Anura
- Family: Phrynobatrachidae
- Genus: Phrynobatrachus
- Species: P. hylaios

Binomial name
- Phrynobatrachus hylaios Perret, 1959

Synonyms
- Phrynobatrachus werneri hylaios Perret, 1959

Species of frog

Phrynobatrachus hylaios is a species of frog in the family Phrynobatrachidae. It is known from southern Cameroon and western Republic of the Congo, although its range presumably extends into nearby Central African Republic, Equatorial Guinea, and Gabon. It was first described as a subspecies of Phrynobatrachus werneri. The common name Foulassi river frog has been coined for it.

== Description ==
Phrynobatrachus hylaios is a small frog with a maximum snout–vent length of 22 mm (0.9 in) in snout–vent length. The body is slender. The snout is moderately pointed. The tympanum is poorly visible, measuring about half of the eye diameter. The finger and toe tips bear small discs. The toes are weakly webbed. Skin is smooth except for small warts on the lower back and the sides, and in males, verruca on the throat. Dorsal coloration is grey-brown.

== Habitat and conservation ==
Phrynobatrachus hylaios is a lowland species but avoids the littoral zone; its altitudinal range extends to 1,200 m (3,900 ft) above sea level, if not higher. It is found in and around Raphia swamps, ditches, marshes, and small pools in forests, degraded secondary habitats, and gallery forests. Breeding takes place in still water. It is a very common and adaptable species that is not facing serious threats. It is probably present in several protected areas.
