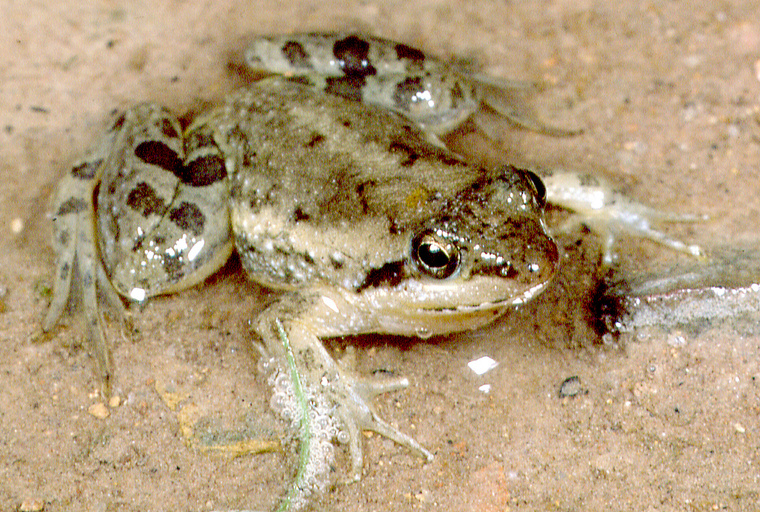

Conservation status
- Least Concern (IUCN 3.1)

Scientific classification
- Kingdom: Animalia
- Phylum: Chordata
- Class: Amphibia
- Order: Anura
- Family: Phrynobatrachidae
- Genus: Phrynobatrachus
- Species: P. perpalmatus

Binomial name
- Phrynobatrachus perpalmatus Boulenger, 1898

Synonyms
- Phrynobatrachus perpalmatus werneri Ahl, 1924

= Phrynobatrachus perpalmatus =

Species of frog

Phrynobatrachus perpalmatus is a species of frog in the family Phrynobatrachidae. It is found in the area stretching from the central and southern Sudan southward through South Sudan and central/eastern Democratic Republic of the Congo, extreme western Tanzania, Burundi, Malawi, and Zambia to northern Mozambique; its range might extend into northern Zimbabwe. Common names Lake Mwero river frog (Note: Possibly in reference to its type locality, "about Lake Mwero") and webbed puddle frog have been proposed for it.

== Description ==
Males grow to 25 mm (1.0 in) and females to 30 mm (1.2 in) in snout–vent length. The body is elongated but short. The snout is rounded. The finger tips are not dilated whereas the toe tips bear small discs; the toes are fully or almost fully webbed. The dorsum is brown and may have a light vertebral stripe. Black, pale-edged bands run from behind the eyes to the groin. Males have a subgular vocal sac that is unpigmented or has black speckling.

The male advertisement call is metallic clicking or a very coarse croak.

== Habitat and conservation ==
Phrynobatrachus perpalmatus occurs in permanently wet habitats in humid savanna, grassland, and rainforest as well as degraded former forest at elevations less than 800 m (2,600 ft) above sea level. It has particular affinity to flooded grassland interspersed with reeds, its presumed breeding habitat.

Phrynobatrachus perpalmatus can be locally very abundant, but its distribution tends to be patchy. Believed to be able to survive in wet areas in agricultural land (including rice paddies), it is probably adaptable and not facing other than localized threats. It is present in a number of protected areas.
