= Phrynobatrachus versicolor =

Conservation status
- Least Concern (IUCN 3.1)

Scientific classification
- Kingdom: Animalia
- Phylum: Chordata
- Class: Amphibia
- Order: Anura
- Family: Phrynobatrachidae
- Genus: Phrynobatrachus
- Species: P. versicolor

Binomial name
- Phrynobatrachus versicolor Ahl, 1924

Synonyms
- Phrynobatrachus (Natalobatrachus) versicolor – Laurent, 1941

Species of frog

Phrynobatrachus versicolor is a species of frog in the family Phrynobatrachidae. It is found in northwestern Burundi, western Rwanda, southwestern Uganda, and adjacent eastern Democratic Republic of the Congo. Common names Rwanda river frog and green puddle frog have been coined for it. The specific name versicolor, derived from the Latin versare ("to change") and color, and refers to its variable dorsal colouration.

== Description ==
Males measure 25–40 mm (1.0–1.6 in) and adult females 25–41 mm (1.0–1.6 in) in snout–vent length. The body is comparatively stocky and robust. The tympanum is distinct. The finger and toe tips bear discs, but are less developed on the toes. The dorsal colouration is variable. The venter is uniform white, pinkish, or yellowish brown with vermiculation or mottling. A median line may be present and extends from the tip of the lower jaw through the chest area, sometimes beyond.

== Habitat and conservation ==
Phrynobatrachus versicolor is a leaf-litter species of mountain forests at elevations of 1,500–2,300 m (4,900–7,500 ft) above sea level, perhaps wider. It is associated particularly with swamps and rivulets where the reproduction takes place. It can be locally common, but the total population is believed to be declining, and it does not occur outside undisturbed habitats. It is threatened by habitat loss caused by agriculture, wood extraction, and expanding human settlements. It occurs in several protected areas: Virunga National Park (Democratic Republic of Congo), Kibale National Park (Uganda), and Bwindi Impenetrable National Park (Uganda).
