= Phrynobatrachus africanus =

Conservation status
- Least Concern (IUCN 3.1)

Scientific classification
- Kingdom: Animalia
- Phylum: Chordata
- Class: Amphibia
- Order: Anura
- Family: Phrynobatrachidae
- Genus: Phrynobatrachus
- Species: P. africanus

Binomial name
- Phrynobatrachus africanus (Hallowell, 1858)

Synonyms
- Heteroglossa africana Hallowell, 1858 "1857"; Arthroleptis africana (Hallowell, 1858); Arthroleptis gabonensis Mocquard, 1897; Arthroleptis verrucosus Werner, 1898; Phrynobatrachus latirostris Boulenger, 1900; Dimorphognathus africanus (Hallowell, 1858)

Species of amphibian

Phrynobatrachus africanus (common name: African swamp frog) is a species of frog in the family Phrynobatrachidae. It is found in Cameroon, Gabon, Equatorial Guinea (including Bioko), southwestern Central African Republic, western Republic of the Congo, and north-central Democratic Republic of the Congo. Its range might extend into Nigeria. The IUCN SSC Amphibian Specialist Group, however, considers the limits of its range unknown and does not include the Democratic Republic of the Congo in the range.

== Description ==
Adults grow to about 30 mm (1.2 in) in snout–vent length. The overall appearance is moderately slender. The tympanum is distinct. The finger and toe tips bear small discs. The fingers have no webbing whereas the toes are moderately webbed. The dorsum is brown or greyish. There is dark brown blotching which becomes apparent under magnification. A dark triangular spot may be present between the eyes. Glandular folds have slightly darker edges. There are several chocolate colored spots or vertical bars on the upper jaws; males have brown lower lips with a series of small white spots. The hind limbs have bark brown (approaching a black) barring. The anal region is blackish, edged with whitish above. The ventral side is white, with brown spotting in the breast. Throat is dark grey in males but spotted with brown in females.

== Habitat and conservation ==
Phrynobatrachus africanus occurs in lowland swampy forests. It can survive in somewhat degraded forests, but not in open habitats outside forest. Males call from cavities and holes near streams. Breeding takes place in pools with standing water along streams.

It is a very common species. It can be negatively affected by loss of its forest habitat caused by logging, agricultural encroachment, and human settlements. It occurs in several protected areas.
