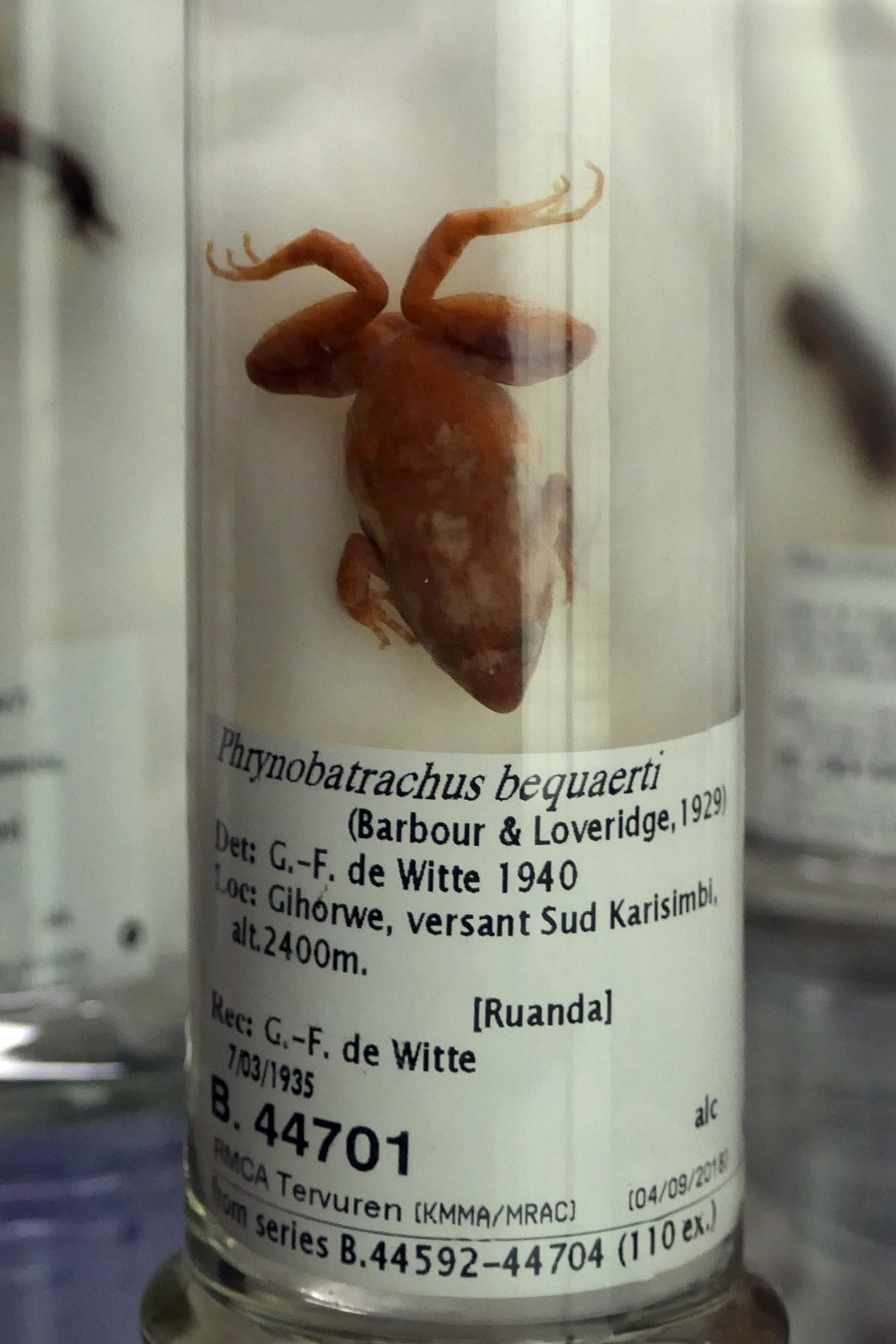

Conservation status
- Least Concern (IUCN 3.1)

Scientific classification
- Kingdom: Animalia
- Phylum: Chordata
- Class: Amphibia
- Order: Anura
- Family: Phrynobatrachidae
- Genus: Phrynobatrachus
- Species: P. bequaerti

Binomial name
- Phrynobatrachus bequaerti (Barbour and Loveridge, 1929)

Synonyms
- Arthroleptis bequaerti Barbour and Loveridge, 1929; Pararthroleptis bequaerti (Barbour and Loveridge, 1929)

= Phrynobatrachus bequaerti =

Species of frog

Phrynobatrachus bequaerti is a species of frog in the family Phrynobatrachidae. It is found in the mountains of north-western Burundi, eastern Democratic Republic of the Congo, and western Rwanda. The specific name bequaerti honours Joseph Charles Bequaert, a Belgian botanist, entomologist, and malacologist and who collected the holotype from Mount Vissoke. Common name Vissoke river frog has been coined for this species.

== Description ==
Specimens in the type series measure 12–25 mm (0.5–1.0 in) in snout–vent length; the largest specimens are all females. The snout is rounded. The tympanum is very distinct. The fingers have no webbing whereas the toes are about one-third webbed; the tips of the digits are slightly dilated. Skin has many small but prominent spiny tubercles. The dorsum is uniform brown, except for chocolate-brown vertebral stripe present in about half of individuals. The lower parts vary from almost immaculate white to having few drown spots to dusky mottling or vermiculation.

== Habitat and conservation ==
Phrynobatrachus bequaerti lives in montane forests, grasslands, and wetlands at elevations of 2,400–3,000 m (7,900–9,800 ft) above sea level. Breeding presumably takes place in swamps. It seems to be common in suitable habitat, although populations appear to be declining, and only a single specimen was found from the Nyungwe Forest National Park during surveys in 2010–2011. The species is suffering from habitat loss and degradation caused by expanding agriculture, grazing of livestock, timber extraction, and expanding human settlements. It is recorded from the Virunga National Park (Democratic Republic of Congo) and the Volcanoes National Park (Rwanda).
