= Phrynobatrachus keniensis =

Conservation status
- Least Concern (IUCN 3.1)

Scientific classification
- Kingdom: Animalia
- Phylum: Chordata
- Class: Amphibia
- Order: Anura
- Family: Phrynobatrachidae
- Genus: Phrynobatrachus
- Species: P. keniensis

Binomial name
- Phrynobatrachus keniensis Barbour and Loveridge, 1928

Species of frog

Phrynobatrachus keniensis is a species of frog in the family Phrynobatrachidae. It is found widely in the highlands of Kenya (Cherang'any Hills in the northwest, Nyambene Hills in the northeast, and from several locations in the Central Highlands, for example from Mount Kenya and the Aberdare Range). It is also recorded from Mount Meru in northern Tanzania, but this might represent a different species. Common names Kenya River frog and upland puddle frog have been coined for it.

== Description ==
Phrynobatrachus keniensis are small frogs; males reach a snout–vent length of no more than 21 mm (0.8 in) and females no more than 26 mm (1.0 in). The overall appearance is stout. The head is as long as it is broad. The snout is rounded or very obtusely pointed. There is a characteristic skin fold at the anterior end of the upper eyelid. The tympanum is hidden. The fingers have no webbing whereas the toes have moderate webbing. The finger and toe tips are not dilated. Skin is smooth but there are some indications of flattened warts on the dorsum and there are some small warts around the vent. The dorsum is purplish to purplish-brown and has a clear brown patch in the interorbital region. Many individuals have a vertebral line. The venter is white but spotted with purplish brown, in particular in a broad band across the breast, on the flanks, and on the tibiae. A dark lateral band on both sides of the head and on the flanks is often present.

== Habitat and conservation ==
Phrynobatrachus keniensis inhabit montane grasslands and montane rainforests at elevations below 3,000 m (9,800 ft). They often occur in association with their breeding habitat, at the edge of water bodies such as swamps and streams. It is an adaptable species that appears not to face any major threats. It can locally be impacted by overgrazing by livestock and smallholder agriculture. It is found in the Mount Kenya and Aberdare National Parks and in the Mau Forest Reserve.
