= Phrynobatrachus ogoensis =

Conservation status
- Data Deficient (IUCN 3.1)

Scientific classification
- Kingdom: Animalia
- Phylum: Chordata
- Class: Amphibia
- Order: Anura
- Family: Phrynobatrachidae
- Genus: Phrynobatrachus
- Species: P. ogoensis

Binomial name
- Phrynobatrachus ogoensis (Boulenger, 1906)

Synonyms
- Arthroleptis ogoensis Boulenger, 1906 "1905"

Species of amphibian

Phrynobatrachus ogoensis (also known as the Ogowe river frog) is a species of frog in the family Phrynobatrachidae. It is endemic to Gabon and is known from its type locality, Lambaréné in the Moyen-Ogooué Province and from the Ramba Village in the Ogooué-Ivindo Province, in the buffer zone of the Lopé National Park.

== Description ==
The type specimen measures 20 mm (0.8 in) in snout–vent length. The snout is obtusely pointed. The tympanum is not visible. The finger tips are feebly dilated. The toes are nearly half-webbed, with the webbing extending as a fringe on the sides to the tips; the toe tips are dilated into small but distinct discs. Dorsal skin is smooth or has small warts. A fold runs from the eye to the shoulder. The dorsum is brown and bears indistinct darker markings. The limbs have darker cross-bands. A light vertebral stripe may be present. The lips have large dark brown spots. The venter is white. The throat is dark brown in males and may be spotted with brown in females. Males have a subgular vocal sac.

== Habitat and conservation ==
Ecology of this species is poorly known. The specimen from the Ramba Village (a gravid female) was collected from leaf litter in secondary forest at 220 m (720 ft) above sea level.

Threats to Phrynobatrachus ogoensis are not known. It is quite possible that it occurs the Lopé National Park.
