= Phrynobatrachus irangi =

Conservation status
- Critically Endangered (IUCN 3.1)

Scientific classification
- Kingdom: Animalia
- Phylum: Chordata
- Class: Amphibia
- Order: Anura
- Family: Phrynobatrachidae
- Genus: Phrynobatrachus
- Species: P. irangi

Binomial name
- Phrynobatrachus irangi Drewes and Perret, 2000

Species of frog

Phrynobatrachus irangi is a species of frog in the family Phrynobatrachidae. It is endemic to Kenya and is known only from two localities, its type locality, the eponymous Irangi Forest on the south-eastern slopes of Mount Kenya, and Kimande on the south-eastern slopes of the Aberdare Range. Common name Irangi puddle frog has been coined for it.

== Description ==
Phrynobatrachus irangi is a large species within its genus: adult males measure 36–46 mm (1.4–1.8 in) and adult females 45–51 mm (1.8–2.0 in) in snout–vent length. The overall appearance is stout. The snout is protruding but rounded. The tympanum is visible and oval in shape. The finger and toe tips are slightly dilated. The fingers have no webbing the webbing between the toes is reduced. Skin is dorsally smooth but there are widely spaced, very small, white-pointed tubercles. Two pairs of thin glandular ridges form an X-like pattern on the dorsum, but without the arms of this pattern touching. Dorsal colouration is dark brown. The snout is light orange-brown (seldom darker), and there are patches of same colour on the shoulder, upper arm, and elbow. The hind limbs are pale brown and bear dark, thick transverse bands. The venter is yellowish to tan. The gular region is somewhat grayish.

== Habitat and conservation ==
Phrynobatrachus irangi is known from montane forests at elevations between 1,900 and 2,300 m (6,200 and 7,500 ft) above sea level. It is diurnal. Males have been observed calling on the banks of small streams, from holes in the mud, and from under roots or logs. The tadpoles probably develop in streams (some were observed but their identity is unconfirmed).

The Kimande population might already be extinct because of habitat modification caused by subsistence farming, which is probably a threat also elsewhere. The range of this species might include the Mount Kenya and Aberdare National Parks.
