= Phrynobatrachus giorgii =

Conservation status
- Data Deficient (IUCN 3.1)

Scientific classification
- Kingdom: Animalia
- Phylum: Chordata
- Class: Amphibia
- Order: Anura
- Family: Phrynobatrachidae
- Genus: Phrynobatrachus
- Species: P. giorgii

Binomial name
- Phrynobatrachus giorgii de Witte, 1921

Species of frog

Phrynobatrachus giorgii is a species of frog in the family Phrynobatrachidae. It is endemic to western or northern Democratic Republic of the Congo and is only known from its type locality, Yambata, possibly in the Province of Équateur. The specific name giorgii honours Stephano Oronzo Vicenzo de Giorgi who collected near Yambata River just before the First World War. Common names Yambata river frog and Giorgi's puddle frog have been proposed for this species.

There is little specific information on ecology of this species, and even its distribution is unclear.
