= Phrynobatrachus pintoi =

Conservation status
- Endangered (IUCN 3.1)

Scientific classification
- Kingdom: Animalia
- Phylum: Chordata
- Class: Amphibia
- Order: Anura
- Family: Phrynobatrachidae
- Genus: Phrynobatrachus
- Species: P. pintoi

Binomial name
- Phrynobatrachus pintoi Hillers, Zimkus & Roedel, 2008

Species of amphibian

Phrynobatrachus pintoi is a species of frog native to Guinea. It can be found at elevations from 200 to 428 meters.

== Description ==
Phrynobatrachus pintoi is found in forests as well as savannas. There are black spots and black bands covering its body. It has an oval, compact body shape and its snout is short and rounded.
