= Phrynobatrachus bullans =

Conservation status
- Least Concern (IUCN 3.1)

Scientific classification
- Kingdom: Animalia
- Phylum: Chordata
- Class: Amphibia
- Order: Anura
- Family: Phrynobatrachidae
- Genus: Phrynobatrachus
- Species: P. bullans

Binomial name
- Phrynobatrachus bullans Crutsinger, Pickersgill, Channing, and Moyer, 2004

Species of frog

Phrynobatrachus bullans is a species of frog in the family Phrynobatrachidae. It is found in northern and central inland Tanzania, southern Ethiopia (Lake Awasa), and southwestern Kenya. Common name bubbling puddle frog has been coined for it.

== Description ==
Adult males measure 20–24 mm (0.8–0.9 in) and adult females 22–27 mm (0.9–1.1 in) in snout–vent length. The snout is short and rounded. The tympanum is visible and darker than the surrounding skin; the supratympanic ridge is minimal. The finger and the toe tips are swollen but not expanded into discs. The fingers have minute webbing whereas the toes are moderately to extensively webbed. The dorsum varies from grey or brown and bears small, white asperities (more in males than in females). The legs have darker banding. The lower jaw has dark brown over white banding. The ventrum is pale to white; the gular region is darker grey with white asperities.

The male advertisement call is a distinctive, long series of notes. It starts softly with increasing volume, then stops, followed by a few longer, irregular notes thereafter.

== Habitat and conservation ==
Phrynobatrachus bullans lives in savanna ecosystems, also in areas with long dry seasons. Breeding takes place in flooded grassland and in pools of water surrounded by vegetation. It can also breed in paddy fields. These frogs have been found in ditches in towns. It is a common and adaptable species that is not facing significant threats. It is present in the Ruaha, Tarangire, Serengeti and Rubobo Island National Parks in Tanzania.
