= Phrynobatrachus gastoni =

Conservation status
- Data Deficient (IUCN 3.1)

Scientific classification
- Kingdom: Animalia
- Phylum: Chordata
- Class: Amphibia
- Order: Anura
- Family: Phrynobatrachidae
- Genus: Phrynobatrachus
- Species: P. gastoni

Binomial name
- Phrynobatrachus gastoni Barbour and Loveridge, 1928

Species of amphibian

Phrynobatrachus gastoni is a species of frog in the family Phrynobatrachidae. It is endemic to the north-central Democratic Republic of the Congo and only known from its type locality, Buta. The specific name gastoni honours Gaston-François de Witte, a Belgian colonial administrator and naturalist who scrutinized the types. Common name Buta river frog has been coined for it.

== Description ==
Phrynobatrachus gastoni is a medium-sized Phrynobatrachus that measures about 30 mm (1.2 in) in snout–vent length (the size of the holotype, an adult female). The overall appearance is stout. The snout is obtusely pointed. The tympanum is visible. The finger and toe tips may be slightly dilated but are not expanded into discs. The fingers have no webbing but the toes have moderate webbing (one-quarter to one-third webbed). The dorsal skin is rugose and warty; the scapular region bears a pair of prominent glands. The ventral skin is smooth. The dorsum is grayish-brown, with slightly darker marbling. There is a lighter transverse band in the interorbital space. The sides of the head and limbs are lighter than the back. The limbs have conspicuous cross bars. The venter is white. The throat has finely stippling of dusky specks, which coalesce to form irregular patches on the lips and a band across the chest.

== Habitat and conservation ==
There is no information in ecology of this species. Threats to it are also unknown.
