= Phrynobatrachus rouxi =

Conservation status
- Data Deficient (IUCN 3.1)

Scientific classification
- Kingdom: Animalia
- Phylum: Chordata
- Class: Amphibia
- Order: Anura
- Family: Phrynobatrachidae
- Genus: Phrynobatrachus
- Species: P. rouxi

Binomial name
- Phrynobatrachus rouxi (Nieden, 1912)

Synonyms
- Arthroleptis rouxi Nieden, 1912 "1911"; Pseudarthroleptis rouxi (Nieden, 1912)

Species of frog

Phrynobatrachus rouxi is a species of frog in the family Phrynobatrachidae. It is found on western shore of Lake Victoria in Uganda and on Mount Kenya in Kenya; the extent of the former part of the range is uncertain and the latter requires confirmation. There is uncertainty regarding validity of this species. The specific name rouxi honours Jean Roux, a Swiss zoologist and herpetologist. Common names Roux's river frog and Roux's puddle frog have been proposed for this species.

There is little specific information on ecology of this species, and even its distribution is unclear.
