= Phrynobatrachus acutirostris =

Conservation status
- Near Threatened (IUCN 3.1)

Scientific classification
- Kingdom: Animalia
- Phylum: Chordata
- Class: Amphibia
- Order: Anura
- Family: Phrynobatrachidae
- Genus: Phrynobatrachus
- Species: P. acutirostris

Binomial name
- Phrynobatrachus acutirostris Nieden, 1912

Species of amphibian

Phrynobatrachus acutirostris, the Rugegewald River frog, is a species of frogs in the family Phrynobatrachidae.

It is found in Burundi, Democratic Republic of the Congo, and Rwanda. Its natural habitats are subtropical or tropical moist montane forest and rivers. It is threatened by habitat loss.
