= Phrynobatrachus albomarginatus =

Conservation status
- Data Deficient (IUCN 3.1)

Scientific classification
- Kingdom: Animalia
- Phylum: Chordata
- Class: Amphibia
- Order: Anura
- Family: Phrynobatrachidae
- Genus: Phrynobatrachus
- Species: P. albomarginatus

Binomial name
- Phrynobatrachus albomarginatus Witte, 1933

Species of frog

Phrynobatrachus albomarginatus is a species of frog in the family Phrynobatrachidae. It is endemic to Democratic Republic of the Congo. Its natural habitats are subtropical or tropical moist lowland forest, swampland, and intermittent freshwater marshes.
