= Phrynobatrachus krefftii =

Conservation status
- Endangered (IUCN 3.1)

Scientific classification
- Kingdom: Animalia
- Phylum: Chordata
- Class: Amphibia
- Order: Anura
- Family: Phrynobatrachidae
- Genus: Phrynobatrachus
- Species: P. krefftii

Binomial name
- Phrynobatrachus krefftii Boulenger, 1909

Synonyms
- Phrynobatrachus (Natalobatrachus) krefftii – Laurent, 1941

Species of frog

Phrynobatrachus krefftii is a species of frog in the family Phrynobatrachidae. It is endemic to the Usambara Mountains in Tanzania, including both the West and East Usambaras and the Magrotto ridge. The specific name krefftii honours Paul Krefft, a German herpetologist and physician who made several expeditions to Africa. Common names Krefft's river frog and Krefft's puddle frog have been coined for it.

== Description ==
Phrynobatrachus krefftii is a relatively large Phrynobatrachus measuring 36–41 mm (1.4–1.6 in) in snout–vent length. The tympanum is distinct. The finger and toe tips bear strongly developed discs. The toe webbing is extensive. The dorsum is brown or olive and has darker spots. Males in breeding conditions portray a sharply projecting snout, thickened nuptial pad on the first toe, bright yellow throat, and lower jaw outlined by a dark stripe. Females and juveniles have white or greenish throat.

== Habitat and conservation ==
Phrynobatrachus krefftii typically occur in montane and submontane forests and streams at elevations of 280–1,500 m (920–4,920 ft) above sea level. They tolerate a mild degree of habitat degradation. They are diurnal and breed in damp and moist areas by streams. The egg masses are laid above the water, attached to rocks or vegetation.

This species is locally common. It is very likely to suffer from forest loss and degradation that occurs within its range, particularly outside protected areas. It occurs, however, in several protected areas, including the relatively well-protected Amani and Nilo Nature Reserves.
