= Phrynobatrachus dalcqi =

Conservation status
- Data Deficient (IUCN 3.1)

Scientific classification
- Kingdom: Animalia
- Phylum: Chordata
- Class: Amphibia
- Order: Anura
- Family: Phrynobatrachidae
- Genus: Phrynobatrachus
- Species: P. dalcqi

Binomial name
- Phrynobatrachus dalcqi Laurent, 1952

Species of amphibian

Phrynobatrachus dalcqi is a species of frogs in the family Phrynobatrachidae. It is endemic to the eastern Democratic Republic of the Congo and only known from Fizi Territory in the South Kivu province. The specific name dalcqi honours "Professor A. Dalcq", presumably Albert Dalcq (1893–1973), a Belgian embryologist. Common names Kivu river frog and Dalcq's puddle frog have been proposed for it.

== Description ==
Phrynobatrachus dalcqi grow to 37 mm (1.5 in) in snout–vent length. The body is compact and the head is short, with a pointed snout. The fingers and the toes bear terminal discs. The toes have distinct basal webbing. Skin is dorsally warty, more so in males than in females. There is a pair of long ridges in the scapular area as well as a medial horseshoe-shaped dorsal ridge. Dorsal colouration is grey-brown with indistinct darker patterning. A light vertebral stripe may be present. The legs have dark crossbars. The venter is pale grey with darker grey stippling (more prominent in females). A clear median line runs through the throat to the pectoral region.

== Habitat and conservation ==
Ecology of Phrynobatrachus dalcqi is poorly known. It is known from elevations of 1,700–1,800 m (5,600–5,900 ft) above sea level and is presumed to be a forest species that breeds in water. Threats to it are unknown. It is not known to occur in any protected areas.
