= Phrynobatrachus cornutus =

Conservation status
- Least Concern (IUCN 3.1)

Scientific classification
- Kingdom: Animalia
- Phylum: Chordata
- Class: Amphibia
- Order: Anura
- Family: Phrynobatrachidae
- Genus: Phrynobatrachus
- Species: P. cornutus

Binomial name
- Phrynobatrachus cornutus (Boulenger, 1906)

Species of frog

Phrynobatrachus cornutus is a species of frog in the family Phrynobatrachidae. It is found in Cameroon, Central African Republic, Republic of the Congo, Equatorial Guinea, and Gabon. Its natural habitats are subtropical or tropical moist lowland forest, swampland, freshwater marshes, intermittent freshwater marshes, and heavily degraded former forest. It is threatened by habitat loss.
