= Phrynobatrachus manengoubensis =

Conservation status
- Critically Endangered (IUCN 3.1)

Scientific classification
- Kingdom: Animalia
- Phylum: Chordata
- Class: Amphibia
- Order: Anura
- Family: Phrynobatrachidae
- Genus: Phrynobatrachus
- Species: P. manengoubensis

Binomial name
- Phrynobatrachus manengoubensis (Angel, 1940)

Synonyms
- Arthroleptis manengoubensis Angel, 1940

Species of frog

Phrynobatrachus manengoubensis is a species of frog in the family Phrynobatrachidae. It is endemic to Cameroon and only known from its type locality in the Monengouba Mountains. However, it is quite likely be a synonym of Phrynobatrachus werneri. It probably breeds in Crater Lake and lives in the surrounding grasslands.
