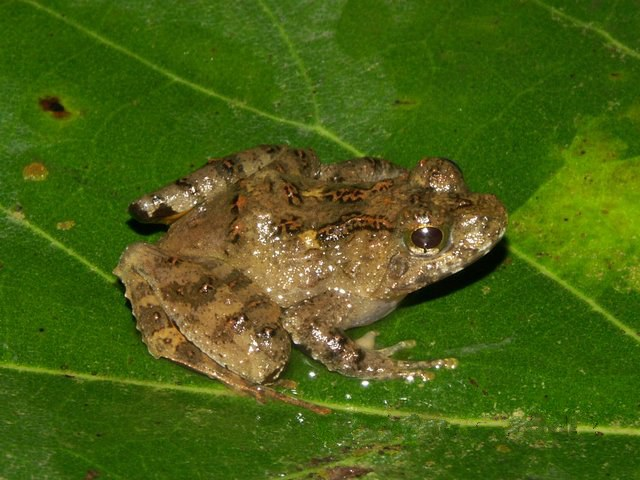

Conservation status
- Near Threatened (IUCN 3.1)

Scientific classification
- Kingdom: Animalia
- Phylum: Chordata
- Class: Amphibia
- Order: Anura
- Family: Phrynobatrachidae
- Genus: Phrynobatrachus
- Species: P. cricogaster

Binomial name
- Phrynobatrachus cricogaster Perret, 1957

= Phrynobatrachus cricogaster =

Species of amphibian

Phrynobatrachus cricogaster is a species of frog in the family Phrynobatrachidae. It is found in the mountains of western Cameroon and southeastern Nigeria. Common name Nkongsamba river frog has been coined for it. The specific name cricogaster is derived from the Greek krikos for "ring" and gaster for "belly", in reference to the prominent ring pattern on its venter. Frogs in the family Phrynobatrachidae are also known as puddle frogs, since they are often found near puddles in sub-Saharan Africa.

== Description ==
Adult males measure 20–24 mm (0.8–0.9 in) and adult females 30–32 mm (1.2–1.3 in) in snout–vent length. The body is moderately slim. The snout is blunt. The tympanum is distinct. The fingers are blunt, hardly dilated, and have no webbing. The toes are slightly but clearly dilated in discs and are three-quarters webbed. The dorsum is brown-black and uniform or with some large brown-red scapular spots. The hind limbs have brown red bars. The venter is cream. Throat is grey and has a cream-coloured median spot near the chest. The belly bears a small central dark circle, possibly with a white center, which is and surrounded by a complete or incomplete circle touching the chest and groin. Males have a subgular vocal sac, and the gular area may be very dark.

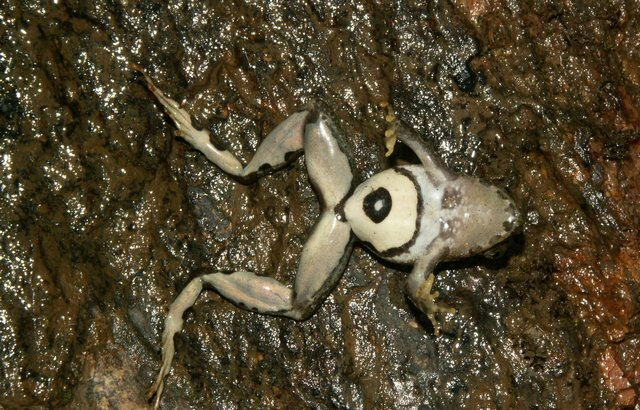
Ventral view, with the characteristic "bull's-eye" pattern prominently visible

== Habitat and conservation ==
Phrynobatrachus cricogaster occurs in submontane and montane primary and secondary forest, degraded forest, and dense brush at elevations of 850–1,850 m (2,790–6,070 ft) above sea level. Breeding takes place in still pools along mountain streams. It can be locally abundant (i.e., on Mount Manengouba), but the overall population is likely to have been decreasing. It is threatened by agricultural expansion, logging, and human settlements, particularly when these activities cause its habitat to be markedly opened up. It is found in the Cross River National Park in Nigeria.
