= Phrynobatrachus asper =

Conservation status
- Vulnerable (IUCN 3.1)

Scientific classification
- Kingdom: Animalia
- Phylum: Chordata
- Class: Amphibia
- Order: Anura
- Family: Phrynobatrachidae
- Genus: Phrynobatrachus
- Species: P. asper

Binomial name
- Phrynobatrachus asper Laurent, 1951

Species of amphibian

Phrynobatrachus asper is a species of frog in the family Phrynobatrachidae. It is endemic to the Itombwe Mountains in the eastern Democratic Republic of the Congo. This little known species occurs in swamps in montane forest above 2,400 m (7,900 ft) above sea level.
