= Phrynobatrachus scapularis =

Conservation status
- Least Concern (IUCN 3.1)

Scientific classification
- Kingdom: Animalia
- Phylum: Chordata
- Class: Amphibia
- Order: Anura
- Family: Phrynobatrachidae
- Genus: Phrynobatrachus
- Species: P. scapularis

Binomial name
- Phrynobatrachus scapularis (de Witte, 1933)

Synonyms
- Arthroleptis scapularis de Witte, 1933

Species of frog

Phrynobatrachus scapularis is a species of frog in the family Phrynobatrachidae. It is endemic to the northern and northeastern Democratic Republic of the Congo. The specific name scapularis refers to shoulder blades (scapulae). Common name Buta river frog has been coined for it.

== Description ==
The male holotype measures 18 mm (0.7 in) in snout–vent length, though a later measurements was only 17 mm (0.7 in). Adult males from the Garamba National Park measure 12–16 mm (0.5–0.6 in) and adult females 13–20 mm (0.5–0.8 in) in snout–vent length. The tympanum is present but is usually obscured by the skin, also described as being completely hidden. The toe webbing is extremely reduced. Dorsal skin is very warty, especially in the scapular region. Alcohol-preserved individuals from the Garamba National Park are dorsally brown with black spots that usually coincide with the warts; a few individuals have a light vertebral line. The type series has greyish dorsum with blackish mottling. The chin and, sometimes, throat have small brown spots. The abdomen is immaculate white to whitish with irregular brown spots. Adult males have a vocal sac.

== Habitat and conservation ==
Phrynobatrachus scapularis occurs in both the savanna and forest zone. In the Garamba National Park, it occurs in wide variety of habitats (from marshes to savanna), but is more common in aquatic habitats, in particular marshes and marshy stream margins. Its habitat preferences in the forest zone are unclear, but it is assumed to tolerate habitat degradation and occur in farm bush habitats. Reproduction takes place during the wet season and is presumed to take place in water. This species believed not to face any significant threats. It occurs in the Garamba National Park.
