= Phrynobatrachus sandersoni =

Conservation status
- Least Concern (IUCN 3.1)

Scientific classification
- Kingdom: Animalia
- Phylum: Chordata
- Class: Amphibia
- Order: Anura
- Family: Phrynobatrachidae
- Genus: Phrynobatrachus
- Species: P. sandersoni

Binomial name
- Phrynobatrachus sandersoni (Parker, 1935)

Synonyms
- Phrynodon sandersoni Parker, 1935

Species of amphibian

Phrynobatrachus sandersoni (common name: Sanderson's hook frog) is a species of frog in the family Phrynobatrachidae. It is found in southwestern Cameroon and in Equatorial Guinea, including the island of Bioko. It is named for Ivan T. Sanderson, a British naturalist and explorer, and later on, author and television commentator.

== Habitat ==
Phrynobatrachus sandersoni live in the vicinity of streams in forest. They are only found in secondary habitats at higher elevations. It is a common species but it probably suffers from the loss of forest habitats.

== Description ==
Phrynobatrachus sandersoni are small frogs: adults measure 21–26 mm (0.83–1.02 in) in snout–vent length. They have a distinct tympanum. Tips of fingers and toes are dilated into large T-shaped discs; the toes have moderate webbing. Breeding males exhibit nuptial pads, lateral vocal folds, femoral glands and enlarged pseudo-teeth in the lower jaw.

== Reproduction ==
Eggs are laid on leaves close to water, but not above water. Female frog may guard its egg clutch usually consisting of 12–17 eggs. The tadpole falls to the ground and develops on land. It has "semi-direct development": the tadpole relies on its yolk and does not eat; it lacks a fully developed alimentary canal.
