= Anolis ahli =

Conservation status
- Endangered (IUCN 3.1)

Scientific classification
- Kingdom: Animalia
- Phylum: Chordata
- Class: Reptilia
- Order: Squamata
- Suborder: Iguania
- Family: Anolidae
- Genus: Anolis
- Species: A. ahli

Binomial name
- Anolis ahli Barbour, 1925

Synonyms
- Anolis ahli Barbour, 1925; Anolis allogus ahli — Barbour, 1937; Anolis mestrei ahli — Hardy, 1958; Anolis ahli — Schwartz, 1968; Norops ahli — Nicholson, 2002

Species of lizard

Anolis ahli, also known commonly as Ahl's anole and the Escambray blue-eyed anole, is a species of lizard in the family Dactyloidae. The species is endemic to Cuba.

== Etymology ==
The specific name, ahli, is in honor of German zoologist Ernst Ahl.

== Habitat ==
The preferred natural habitat of A. ahli is forest.

== Description ==
Moderate-sized for its genus, A. ahli may attain a snout-to-vent length (SVL) of 5.5 cm (2.2 in) in males. Females are about 10% smaller than males, with a maximum SVL of 4.8 cm (1.9 in). The iris of the eye is blue.

== Diet ==
A. ahli preys upon fruit flies, roaches, and isopods.

== Reproduction ==
A. ahli is oviparous.
