= Phrynobatrachus kinangopensis =

Conservation status
- Vulnerable (IUCN 3.1)

Scientific classification
- Kingdom: Animalia
- Phylum: Chordata
- Class: Amphibia
- Order: Anura
- Family: Phrynobatrachidae
- Genus: Phrynobatrachus
- Species: P. kinangopensis

Binomial name
- Phrynobatrachus kinangopensis Angel, 1924

Species of frog

Phrynobatrachus kinangopensis is a species of frog in the family Phrynobatrachidae. It is endemic to the Kenyan Highlands east of the Great Rift Valley. Both the scientific name and its common names, Kinangop river frog and Kinangop puddle frog, refer to its type locality, Mount Kinangop.

== Description ==
Males measure up to 19 mm (0.75 in) and females up to 24 mm (0.94 in) in snout–vent length. In addition to the sexual dimorphism ins size, mature males differ from females by having small, white asperities on the posterior half of the body and a speckled throat. The feet are moderately to extensively webbed. There is a dark band running from the nostrils to the tympanum, sometimes border by a silvery streak.

== Distribution ==
The species is distributed in the Kenyan Highlands between the Aberdare Mountains (including the eponymous Kinangop Plateau), Mount Kenya, and Nairobi at elevations of 1,800–3,100 m (5,900–10,200 ft) above sea level.

== Habitat and conservation ==
Phrynobatrachus kinangopensis occurs in montane grasslands and forests and is associated with rain-filled temporary pools, its presumed breeding habitat.

Phrynobatrachus kinangopensis is a rare species, although this impression might also be caused by surveys conducted at a wrong time of the year. Nevertheless, intensive subsistence agriculture is causing habitat deterioration and loss outside the national parks—the species occurs in both the Aberdare and Mount Kenya National Parks. Agro-chemicals might also be an issue. The International Union for Conservation of Nature (IUCN) considers it "Vulnerable".
