= Phrynobatrachus taiensis =

Conservation status
- Data Deficient (IUCN 3.1)

Scientific classification
- Kingdom: Animalia
- Phylum: Chordata
- Class: Amphibia
- Order: Anura
- Family: Phrynobatrachidae
- Genus: Phrynobatrachus
- Species: P. taiensis

Binomial name
- Phrynobatrachus taiensis Perret, 1988

Species of frog

Phrynobatrachus taiensis is a species of frog in the family Phrynobatrachidae. It is endemic to Ivory Coast and only known from its type locality, Taï Forest in the Taï National Park. There are concerns about taxonomic validity of this species. Common name Tai river frog has been coined for it.

== Description ==
The holotype, an adult male, measures 14 mm (0.6 in) in snout–vent length; females are unknown but presumably larger. The tympanum is indistinct. The eyelid has a prominent tubercle. The finger and toe tips are barely widened and have no discs. The fingers are unwebbed and the toes have only rudimentary webbing. The dorsum is warty and has a pair of oval scapular glands. Dorsal colouration is brown with (male holotype) or without marbling (juvenile paratype). The holotype has a vertebral line running the whole length of the body. The limbs have slightly darker brown bars. The ventrum bears dark spots that form curvilinear, transverse rows on the throat. The belly is immaculate but small spots are scattered on the chest and on its edges.

== Habitat and conservation ==
Phrynobatrachus taiensis is presumably a lowland rainforest species that, like its relatives, breeds in water. It has not been collected after the type series was collected in 1975, despite extensive amphibian surveys in later years—this species must either be extremely rare or not valid. If it is a forest-dependent species, then it is probably negatively affected by the loss of forest habitat caused by agricultural development, logging, and human settlements. The type locality is within the Taï National Park.
