= Phrynobatrachus anotis =

Conservation status
- Data Deficient (IUCN 3.1)

Scientific classification
- Kingdom: Animalia
- Phylum: Chordata
- Class: Amphibia
- Order: Anura
- Family: Phrynobatrachidae
- Genus: Phrynobatrachus
- Species: P. anotis

Binomial name
- Phrynobatrachus anotis Schmidt & Inger, 1959

Species of frog

Phrynobatrachus anotis is a species of frog in the family Phrynobatrachidae. It is endemic to Democratic Republic of the Congo. Its natural habitats are dry savanna and moist savanna.
