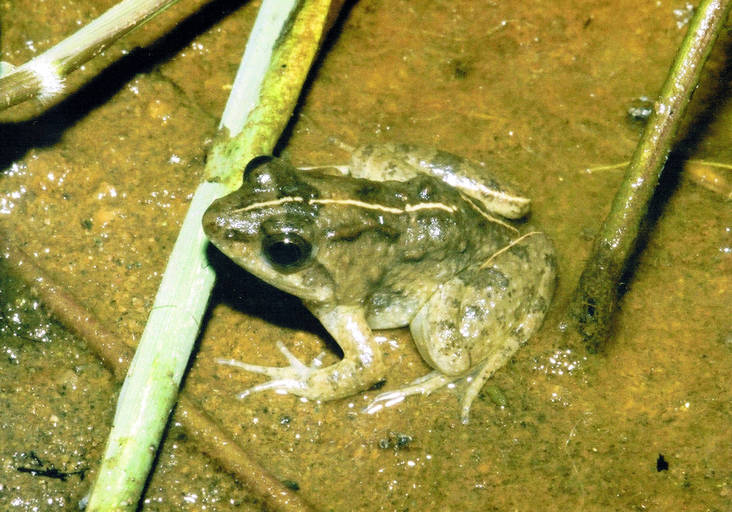

Conservation status
- Least Concern (IUCN 3.1)

Scientific classification
- Kingdom: Animalia
- Phylum: Chordata
- Class: Amphibia
- Order: Anura
- Family: Phrynobatrachidae
- Genus: Phrynobatrachus
- Species: P. acridoides

Binomial name
- Phrynobatrachus acridoides (Cope, 1867)

Synonyms
- Staurois acridoides Cope, 1867; Phrynobatrachus boulengeri de Witte, 1918; Hylarthroleptis boulengeri (de Witte, 1918); Arthroleptis boulengeri (de Witte, 1918); Hylarthroleptis medilineatus Ahl, 1925 "1923"; Phrynobatrachus medilineatus (Ahl, 1925); Hylarthroleptis janenschi Ahl, 1925 "1923"; Phrynobatrachus janenschi (Ahl, 1925)

= Phrynobatrachus acridoides =

Species of frog

Phrynobatrachus acridoides is a species of frog in the family Phrynobatrachidae. It is widely distributed in the lowlands of eastern Africa, from Kenya and southern Somalia in the north and southward to Tanzania (including the Mafia, Zanzibar, and Pemba islands), Malawi, Mozambique, eastern Zimbabwe, and easternmost South Africa (KwaZulu-Natal). Its range might extend into Eswatini in the south and westward to Uganda and Zambia. This widespread species has also many vernacular names: East African puddle frog, small puddle frog, eastern puddle frog, Zanzibar puddle frog, Zanzibar river frog, Mababe toad-frog, and Cope's toad-frog. It is morphologically and genetically most similar to Phrynobatrachus pakenhami, its sister species. However, the specific name acridoides appears to refer to its superficial similarity to the North American cricket frog Acris gryllus, of no close relation (family Hylidae).

== Description ==
Males can reach a maximum snout–vent length of 27 to 28 mm (1.1 to 1.1 in) and females 25 to 30 mm (1.0 to 1.2 in), depending on the source. The tympanum is round and typically visible. The snout is narrowed, rounded, and somewhat prominent. The toes are moderately webbed. The dorsum is greyish-olive or greyish-brown. This species exhibits a number of different color morphs; a narrow pale or green vertebral band is often present. The limbs are barred. The venter is white but has a yellowish hue near the groin and a pale stripe occurs on the back of the thigh. The throat and breast are white and have brown punctuations, or are generally darkened (in both sexes). Males have a vocal sac.

The male advertisement call has been characterized as "a coarse, rasping croak", "a continual harsh creaking snore", or "cricket-like".

== Habitat and conservation ==
Phrynobatrachus acridoides occurs in dry and humid savanna, shrubland, grassland, and coastal habitats. It adapts to habitat modification. Breeding takes place in mostly temporary but also permanent waterbodies, such as puddles, pools, swamps, vleis, roadside ditches, and flooded grassy depressions. The eggs are mostly laid in aquatic vegetation below the water surface. This species can be predated by snakes Psammophis sibilans and Thelotornis capensis.

It is an adaptable, common, and sometimes abundant species that is not facing significant threats. Nevertheless, it seems to have declined in its range margin in South Africa for reasons that are not clear. It is present in many protected areas.
