= Phrynobatrachus rungwensis =

Conservation status
- Least Concern (IUCN 3.1)

Scientific classification
- Kingdom: Animalia
- Phylum: Chordata
- Class: Amphibia
- Order: Anura
- Family: Phrynobatrachidae
- Genus: Phrynobatrachus
- Species: P. rungwensis

Binomial name
- Phrynobatrachus rungwensis (Loveridge, 1932)

Synonyms
- Arthroleptis rungwensis Loveridge, 1932

Species of frog

Phrynobatrachus rungwensis is a species of frog in the family Phrynobatrachidae. It is found in southeastern Democratic Republic of the Congo, central and northern Malawi, and east to southern and central Tanzania. It is also expected to occur in northeastern Zambia. Common names Rungwe puddle frog and Rungwe river frog have been coined for it. It is named after Mount Rungwe, its type locality.

== Description ==
Adult males measure 17–18 mm (0.67–0.71 in) (possibly as much 23 mm) and adult females 21–24 mm (0.8–0.9 in) in snout–vent length. The tympanum is indistinct. The original species description (based on a single female) reported fingers and toes as tapered and not dilated, but middle toes have also been reported as being expanded into small discs, with circummarginal grooves sometimes present. The toes have some webbing. Females have throat that is blotched with brown, whereas the gular region in males is greyish or speckled. In preserved specimens, the dorsum is dusky brown and heavily overlaid with black. The venter is white.

== Habitat and conservation ==
Phrynobatrachus rungwensis lives in miombo woodland savannas and open grasslands, including montane ones, at elevations of about 1,000 to 2,000 m (3,300 to 6,600 ft) above sea level. It is often found near grassy pools, puddles, and marshes, its presumed breeding habitat. It is a common species in suitable habitats and unlikely to face significant threats. It occurs in the Upemba National Park in the Democratic Republic of Congo, and likely in other protected areas too.
