= Phrynobatrachus sulfureogularis =

Conservation status
- Vulnerable (IUCN 3.1)

Scientific classification
- Kingdom: Animalia
- Phylum: Chordata
- Class: Amphibia
- Order: Anura
- Family: Phrynobatrachidae
- Genus: Phrynobatrachus
- Species: P. sulfureogularis

Binomial name
- Phrynobatrachus sulfureogularis Laurent, 1951

Species of frog

Phrynobatrachus sulfureogularis is a species of frog in the family Phrynobatrachidae. It is known from the Massif of Nanzergwa, its type locality in the Bururi Province of western Burundi, and from the Mahale Mountains National Park in eastern Tanzania. The specific name sulfureogularis is derived from the Latin sulfur that refers to the element that is yellow in color and gula meaning throat, in reference to the bright yellow throat in breeding males. Common name central river frog has been coined for it.

== Description ==
Male Phrynobatrachus sulfureogularis grow to a snout–urostyle length of 43 mm (1.7 in) and females to 44 mm (1.7 in); the holotype (a female) is reported to measure 47 mm (1.9 in) in snout–vent length. The snout is pointed or more rounded, but always distinctly overhanging the lower jaw. The tympanum is distinct, about three-quarters of the eye diameter; the supratympanic fold is weak. The fingers have no webbing, whereas the toes are two-thirds webbed. The dorsal coloration is dark brown with darker speckles. Two clear dorsolateral stripes may be present. Breeding males have bright sulfur-yellow throat.

== Habitat and conservation ==
Phrynobatrachus sulfureogularis occurs in montane forests in Tanzania, and the locality in Burundi is supposed to have been forested at the time of collection. This species has been found at elevations between 2,100 and 2,500 m (6,900 and 8,200 ft) above sea level. It has not been recorded outside forest. It is threatened by habitat loss caused by agriculture, wood extraction, and expanding human settlements. It might also be collected for food. The population in Tanzania is with a protected area.
