= Phrynobatrachus uzungwensis =

Conservation status
- Near Threatened (IUCN 3.1)

Scientific classification
- Kingdom: Animalia
- Phylum: Chordata
- Class: Amphibia
- Order: Anura
- Family: Phrynobatrachidae
- Genus: Phrynobatrachus
- Species: P. uzungwensis

Binomial name
- Phrynobatrachus uzungwensis Grandison and Howell, 1983

Species of amphibian

Phrynobatrachus uzungwensis is a species of frogs in the family Phrynobatrachidae. It is endemic to eastern Tanzania and is known from the Udzungwa, Uluguru, Nguu, and Nguru Mountains. Common names Ukinga puddle frog and Udzungwa puddle frog have been coined for this species.

== Description ==
Adult males measure 16–21 mm (0.6–0.8 in) and adult females 21–25 mm (0.8–1.0 in) in snout–vent length. The body is stocky. The snout is slightly pointed. The tympanum is inconspicuous. The toes are broadly webbed. The finger and toe tips are expanded and have circummarginal grooves. The dorsum has rich, reddish brown colouration. A large, red or orange transverse zone between the arm insertions across the shoulders may be present; it is bordered by a darker brown or blackish transverse band. Additional patterning may include a dark interorbital band or inverted triangle, and chevrons or dark transverse bands at the level of the axillae. A pale area in front of the interorbital band and a pale spot between the shoulders are often evident. The limbs have crossbars, except for the upper arms. The upper arms are orange and the tips of the digits are bright red. The lower jaw is blackish. Males have an unpigmented vocal sac and more white spines on the gular skin.

== Habitat and conservation ==
Phrynobatrachus uzungwensis lives in submontane and montane forests at elevations generally higher than 900 m (3,000 ft) above sea level. It is associated with mountain streams, its probable breeding habitat. The types were found in vegetation just above the ground, on rocks, and in a small pool of water close to a stream; the last micro-habitat included an amplexant pair.

While Phrynobatrachus uzungwensis is locally abundant within suitable habitat, it is negatively affected by the loss of its forest habitat resulting from agriculture, logging, fire, and human settlements. It has been recorded in the Udzungwa Mountains National Park and in the Uluguru North, Nguru South, and Kanga Forest Reserves.
