= Golden puddle frog =

Conservation status
- Least Concern (IUCN 3.1)

Scientific classification
- Kingdom: Animalia
- Phylum: Chordata
- Class: Amphibia
- Order: Anura
- Family: Phrynobatrachidae
- Genus: Phrynobatrachus
- Species: P. auritus

Binomial name
- Phrynobatrachus auritus Boulenger, 1900

Species of amphibian

The golden puddle frog (Phrynobatrachus auritus) is a species of frog in the family Phrynobatrachidae. It is found in Cameroon, Central African Republic, Republic of the Congo, Democratic Republic of the Congo, Equatorial Guinea, Gabon, Nigeria, Rwanda, Uganda, and possibly Angola. Its natural habitats are subtropical or tropical moist lowland forest, rivers, freshwater marshes, intermittent freshwater marshes, and heavily degraded former forest. It is threatened by habitat loss due to deforestation.
