= Phrynobatrachus chukuchuku =

Conservation status
- Critically Endangered (IUCN 3.1)

Scientific classification
- Kingdom: Animalia
- Phylum: Chordata
- Class: Amphibia
- Order: Anura
- Family: Phrynobatrachidae
- Genus: Phrynobatrachus
- Species: P. chukuchuku

Binomial name
- Phrynobatrachus chukuchuku Zimkus, 2009

Species of amphibian

Phrynobatrachus chukuchuku, the spiny puddle frog, is a species of frog in the family Phrynobatrachidae. They are endemic to Cameroon, and considered Critically Endangered.

== Taxonomy ==
The spiny puddle frog was described in 2009 by Breda M. Zimkus. Its specific name, "chukuchuku" comes from a Cameroonian pidgin English phrase meaning "spiny" or "thorny".

== Description ==
Spiny puddle frogs are easily distinguished from other members of their genus due to the unique ventral coloration of the males, a dark black. The females possess a much lighter throat coloration. Females are also larger than males, being an average of 17–19 mm long, while males are closer to 15–16 mm long. The common name of spiny puddle frog comes from the spinules male possess on their undersides.

As tadpoles, spiny puddle frogs range from 6–7 mm long, and have ovoid body shapes. They're dark in coloration.

== Habitat and distribution ==
The spiny puddle frog is only known from grasslands near the summit of Mount Oku in Cameroon. Surveys conducted in the area find them most often frequenting springs and wetlands. Tadpoles are found in slow-moving waters in montane grassland.

== History and conservation ==
Spiny puddle frogs were first discovered in 2006, and were described in 2009. They are threatened by a number of things, including climate change, livestock grazing, fire, and disease. Conservation efforts in the area are scarce, and experts believe that more research needs to be conducted on Mount Oku to determine how to protect its fauna, including the spiny puddle frog, from these threats. The species was added to the IUCN Red List as Critically Endangered in 2011.
