= Phrynobatrachus batesii =

Conservation status
- Least Concern (IUCN 3.1)

Scientific classification
- Kingdom: Animalia
- Phylum: Chordata
- Class: Amphibia
- Order: Anura
- Family: Phrynobatrachidae
- Genus: Phrynobatrachus
- Species: P. batesii

Binomial name
- Phrynobatrachus batesii (Boulenger, 1906)

Species of frog

Phrynobatrachus batesii is a species of frog in the family Phrynobatrachidae. It is found in Cameroon, Gabon, Ghana, Nigeria, possibly Equatorial Guinea, and possibly Togo. Its natural habitats are subtropical or tropical moist lowland forest, freshwater marshes, intermittent freshwater marshes, and heavily degraded former forest. It is threatened by habitat loss.
