= Phrynobatrachus fraterculus =

Conservation status
- Least Concern (IUCN 3.1)

Scientific classification
- Kingdom: Animalia
- Phylum: Chordata
- Class: Amphibia
- Order: Anura
- Family: Phrynobatrachidae
- Genus: Phrynobatrachus
- Species: P. fraterculus

Binomial name
- Phrynobatrachus fraterculus (Chabanaud, 1921)

Species of frog

Phrynobatrachus fraterculus is a species of frog in the family Phrynobatrachidae. It is found in Ivory Coast, Guinea, Liberia, Sierra Leone and possibly Guinea-Bissau. Its natural habitats are subtropical or tropical moist lowland forest, subtropical or tropical moist montane forest, rivers, plantations and heavily degraded former forest. It is threatened by habitat loss.
