= Phrynobatrachus cryptotis =

Conservation status
- Data Deficient (IUCN 3.1)

Scientific classification
- Kingdom: Animalia
- Phylum: Chordata
- Class: Amphibia
- Order: Anura
- Family: Phrynobatrachidae
- Genus: Phrynobatrachus
- Species: P. cryptotis

Binomial name
- Phrynobatrachus cryptotis Schmidt & Inger, 1959

Species of frog

Phrynobatrachus cryptotis is a species of frog in the family Phrynobatrachidae. It is endemic to Democratic Republic of the Congo. Its natural habitats are subtropical or tropical dry forest, moist savanna, rivers, swampland, freshwater marshes, and intermittent freshwater marshes.
