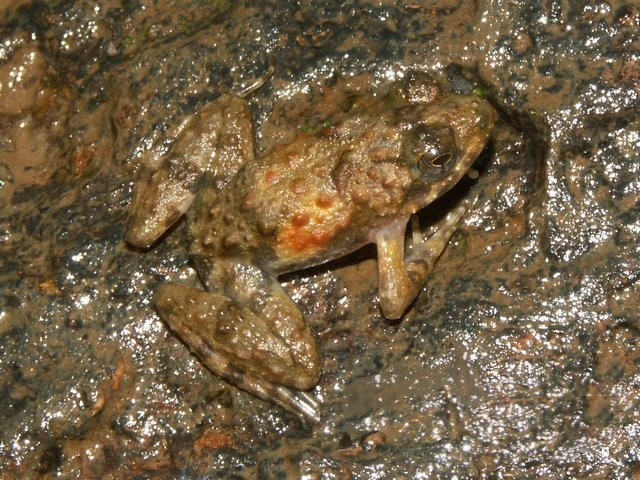

Conservation status
- Least Concern (IUCN 3.1)

Scientific classification
- Kingdom: Animalia
- Phylum: Chordata
- Class: Amphibia
- Order: Anura
- Family: Phrynobatrachidae
- Genus: Phrynobatrachus
- Species: P. calcaratus

Binomial name
- Phrynobatrachus calcaratus (Peters, 1863)

Synonyms
- Hemimantis calcaratus Peters, 1863; Arthroleptis calcarata (Peters, 1863); Arthroleptis calcaratus (Peters, 1863); Hyperolius (Arthroleptis) calcaratus (Peters, 1863); Pseudarthroleptis calcaratus (Peters, 1863); Phrynobatrachus (Pararthroleptis) calcaratus (Peters, 1863)

= Phrynobatrachus calcaratus =

Species of frog

Phrynobatrachus calcaratus, the Boutry river frog or Peters' puddle frog, is a species of frog in the family Phrynobatrachidae. It is widely distributed in West Africa (Senegal, Gambia, Guinea-Bissau, Guinea, Liberia, Ivory Coast, Ghana, Togo, Benin, and Nigeria, and possibly adjacent countries) and Middle Africa (Cameroon, Central African Republic, and Bioko (Equatorial Guinea), possibly wider). However, this nominal species is a species complex consisting of several species.

== Description ==
Phrynobatrachus calcaratus is a small frog with a rounded snout and a moderately warty skin, growing to a snout-to-vent length of about 11 to 19 mm (0.4 to 0.7 in) for males and 16 to 23 mm (0.6 to 0.9 in) for females. The digits do not have enlarged tips and the fingers and toes are largely unwebbed. Most animals have a uniformly coloured greenish or brownish dorsal surface, slightly darker around the warts, and a whitish belly, but some have a spinal band of red with yellowish borders and a few have a red transverse band. The male has a prominent black vocal sac on the throat during the breeding season.

== Habitat ==
This species is found in gallery forests in humid savannas, secondary forest along streams in the forest zone, and farm bush; it can also colonize savanna that has not burned. It is found mainly in lowland habitats, but elevations of 1,200 m (3,900 ft) in Cameroon.

== Reproduction ==
The males call near suitable waterbodies and the females lay clutches of a few hundred eggs which hatch in three days. Tadpole growth is fast and the animals become mature at four to five months. They have a short lifespan and probably die within a few months of spawning.

== Status ==
Phrynobatrachus calcaratus is listed by the International Union for Conservation of Nature (IUCN) as being of "least concern" as it is an adaptable species with a very wide range and its numbers appear to be stable.
