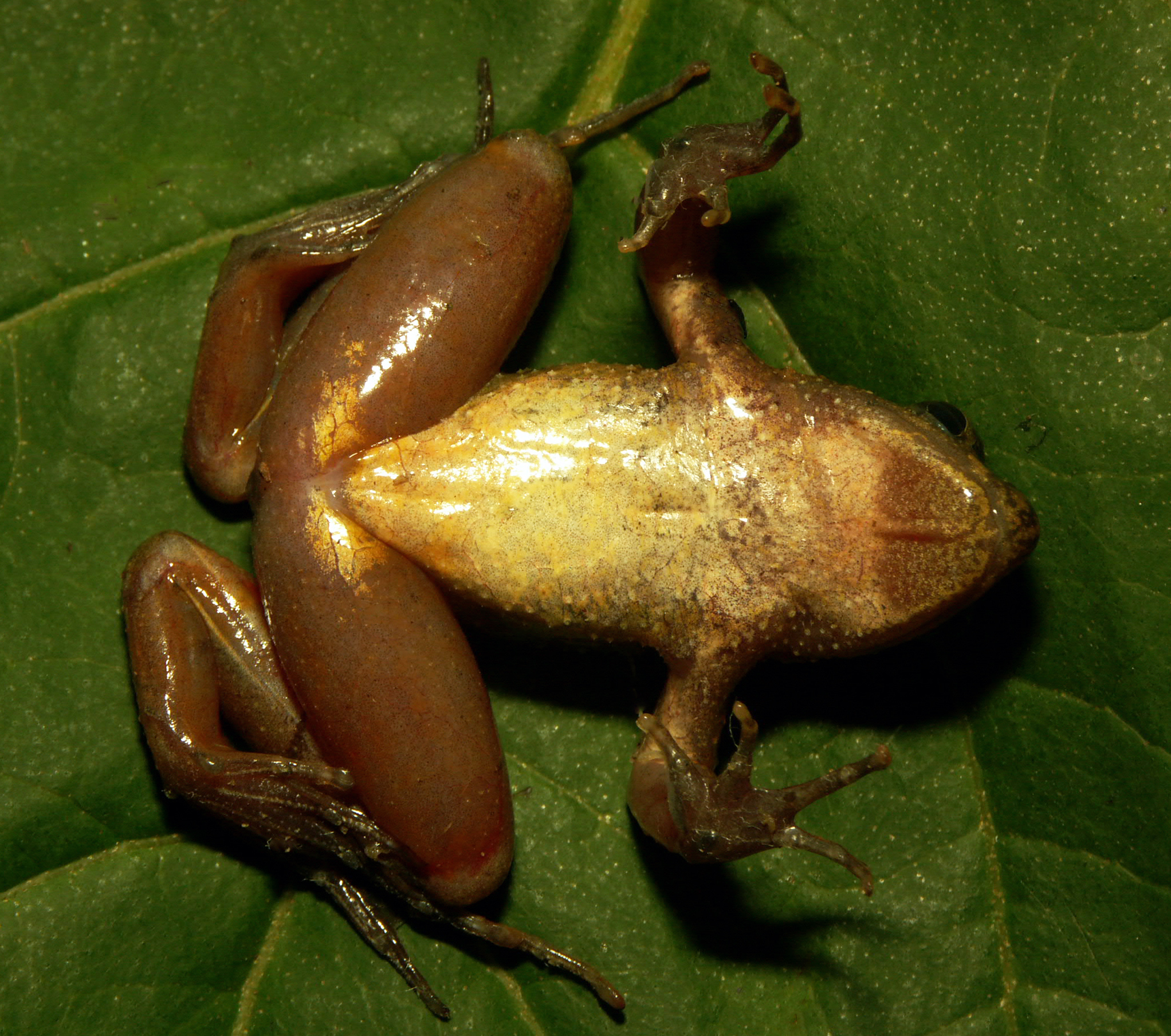

Conservation status
- Critically Endangered (IUCN 3.1)

Scientific classification
- Kingdom: Animalia
- Phylum: Chordata
- Class: Amphibia
- Order: Anura
- Family: Phrynobatrachidae
- Genus: Phrynobatrachus
- Species: P. jimzimkusi

Binomial name
- Phrynobatrachus jimzimkusi Zimkus, Gvoždík, and Gonwouo, 2013

= Phrynobatrachus jimzimkusi =

Species of amphibian

Phrynobatrachus jimzimkusi is a species of frogs in the family Phrynobatrachidae. It is found in submontane and montane regions within the Cameroon volcanic line (Mount Manengouba, Bamboutos Mountains, Mount Lefo, and Mount Oku) as well as the adjacent Obudu Plateau in the southeast of Nigeria. It is named after James (Jim) Zimkus by his wife, Breda Zimkus, the first author of the species description. Common name Jim Zimkus' puddle frog has been proposed for this species.

== Description ==
Adult males measure 32–34 mm (1.3–1.3 in) and adult females 29–32 mm (1.1–1.3 in) in snout–vent length. The body shape is compact and the hind limbs are strong. The tympanum is indistinct or only scarcely visible; supratympanic fold is present. Fingers lack webbing and have small but distinct discs. Toes are moderately to extensively webbed and have small discs. Dorsal coloration varies from medium to dark brown. Coloration may appear uniform but typically includes some lighter and darker spots. Some individuals have a thick, light brown mid-dorsal stripe. Ventral coloration is similarly mottled in the pectoral and abdominal regions.

== Habitat and conservation ==
Phrynobatrachus jimzimkusi occurs in calm, pool-like passages of rapid streams in montane forests, including stream-fringing forests in montane savanna, at elevations of 1,300–2,900 m (4,300–9,500 ft) above sea level. Furthermore, it can sometimes be found along streams in open grassland, especially at higher elevations, and can persist in very degraded habitats, even in those without canopy cover. Females attach clutches of eggs in small groups to root hairs or vegetation floating in the water column. The tadpoles live in pools in streams. This species seems to be diurnal.

Once locally abundant, this species has declined in recent years. Although conclusive evidence is lacking, the decline is similar to that caused by chytridiomycosis for other montane amphibians. It is also highly threatened by agricultural pressure including cattle grazing, use of herbicides and pesticides, burning of montane grasslands, and harvesting for firewood, as well as by expanding human settlements. It is present in the Cross River National Park in Nigeria.
