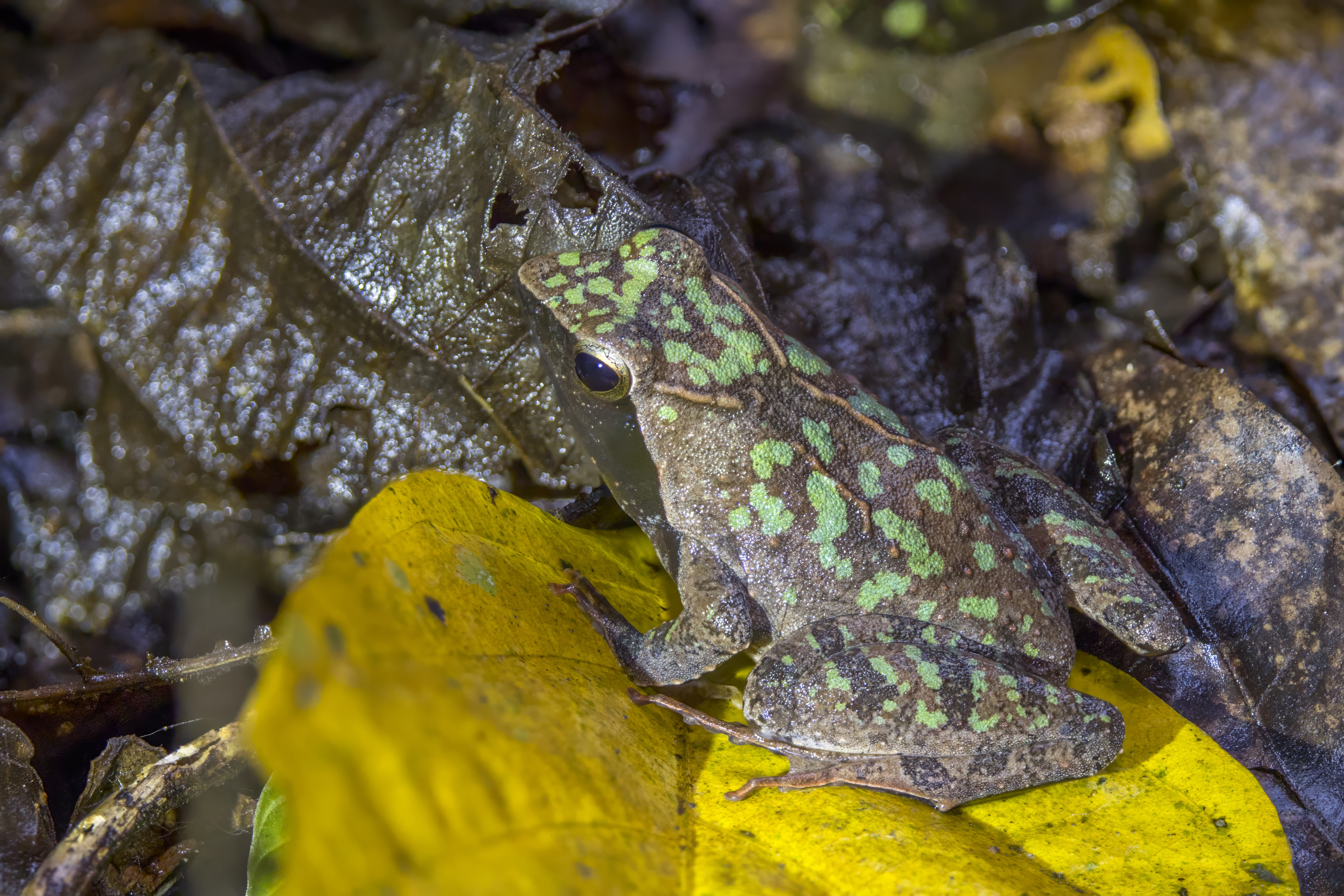
- In Nyamebe Bepo Forest Reserve, Ashanti Region
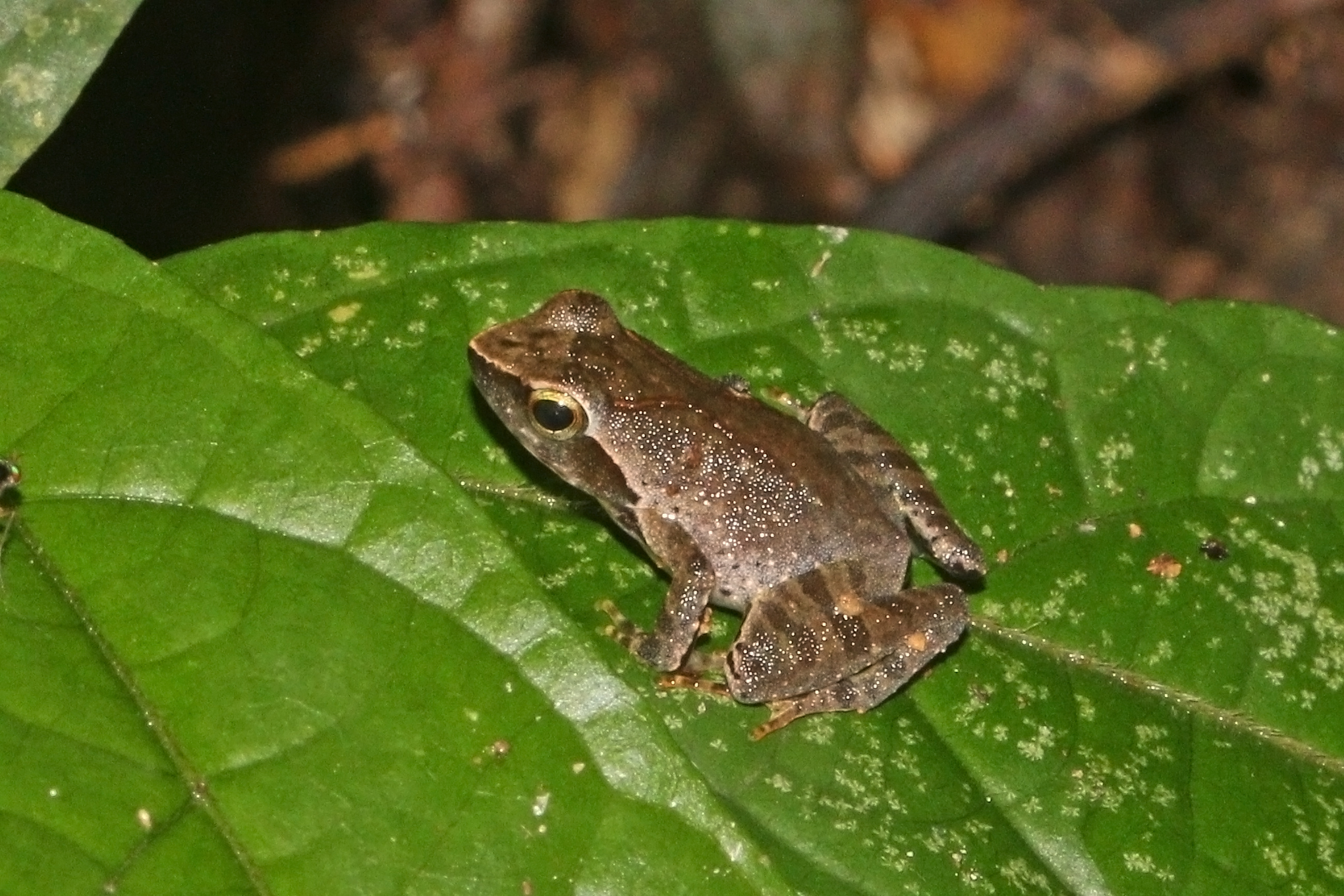
- In Kakum National Park; Both in Ghana

Conservation status
- Least Concern (IUCN 3.1)

Scientific classification
- Kingdom: Animalia
- Phylum: Chordata
- Class: Amphibia
- Order: Anura
- Family: Phrynobatrachidae
- Genus: Phrynobatrachus
- Species: P. plicatus

Binomial name
- Phrynobatrachus plicatus (Gunther, 1858)

Synonyms
- Phrynobatrachus aelleni Loveridge, 1955

= Phrynobatrachus plicatus =

Species of frog

Phrynobatrachus plicatus is a species of frog in the family Petropedetidae. It is found in Côte d'Ivoire, Ghana, Guinea, Liberia, and Nigeria.

Its natural habitats are subtropical or tropical moist lowland forest, freshwater marshes, and intermittent freshwater marshes. It is threatened by habitat loss.
