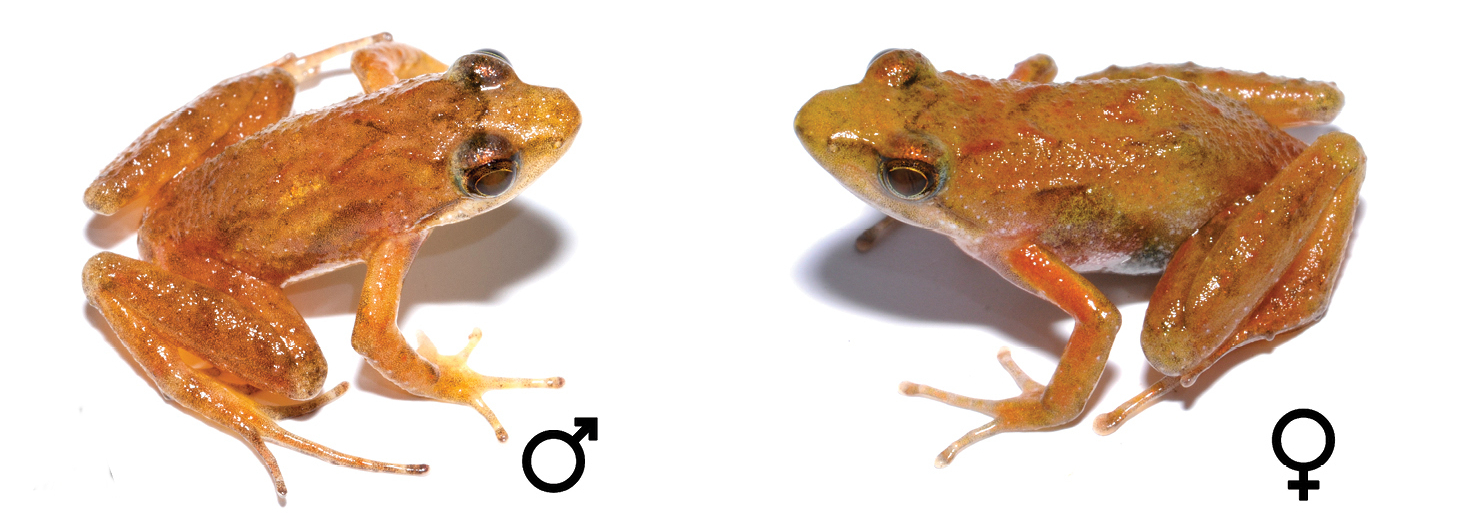
- A male and a female of Phrynobatrachus bibita

Scientific classification
- Kingdom: Animalia
- Phylum: Chordata
- Class: Amphibia
- Order: Anura
- Superfamily: Ranoidea
- Family: Phrynobatrachidae; Laurent, 1941
- Genus: Phrynobatrachus; Günther, 1862

Species
- See text

Synonyms
- Phrynodon Parker, 1935

= Phrynobatrachus =

Genus of amphibians

Phrynobatrachus is a genus of Sub-Saharan frogs that form the monogeneric family Phrynobatrachidae. Their common name is puddle frogs, dwarf puddle frogs, African puddle frogs, or African river frogs. The common name, puddle frog, refers to the fact that many species breed in temporary waterbodies such as puddles.

Phrynobatrachus are among the most common amphibians in Africa. They are typically small (mostly less than 30 mm (1.2 in)), fast-moving frogs. They occupy a variety of habitats from dry savannas to rainforests. Most species deposit many small eggs as a surface clutch in standing or slowly moving water and have exotrophic tadpoles.

== Taxonomy ==
Phrynobatrachidae has earlier been considered as a subfamily of Ranidae, but its recognition as a family is now well-established. It is probably most closely related to Petropedetidae and Pyxicephalidae or Ptychadenidae.

This large genus may be further divided into three major clades. These clades could be treated as different genera, but this arrangement is not yet in use.

== Species ==
There are currently 96 species in this genus:

- Phrynobatrachus acridoides (Cope, 1867)
- Phrynobatrachus acutirostris Nieden, 1912
- Phrynobatrachus afiabirago Ofori-Boateng, Leaché, Obeng-Kankam, Kouamé, Hillers & Rödel, 2018
- Phrynobatrachus africanus (Hallowell, 1858)
- Phrynobatrachus albifer (Ahl, 1924)
- Phrynobatrachus albomarginatus De Witte, 1933
- Phrynobatrachus alleni Parker, 1936
- Phrynobatrachus ambanguluensis Greenwood, Loader, Lawson, Greenbaum, and Zimkus, 2020
- Phrynobatrachus amieti Nečas, Dolinay, Zimkus, and Gvoždík, 2021
- Phrynobatrachus annulatus Perret, 1966
- Phrynobatrachus anotis Schmidt and Inger, 1959
- Phrynobatrachus arcanus Gvoždík, Nečas, Dolinay, Zimkus, Schmitz, and Fokam, 2020
- Phrynobatrachus asper Laurent, 1951
- Phrynobatrachus auritus Boulenger, 1900
- Phrynobatrachus batesii (Boulenger, 1906)
- Phrynobatrachus bequaerti (Barbour and Loveridge, 1929)
- Phrynobatrachus bibita Goutte, Reyes-Velasco, and Boissinot, 2019
- Phrynobatrachus breviceps Pickersgill, 2007
- Phrynobatrachus brevipalmatus (Ahl, 1925)
- Phrynobatrachus brongersmai Parker, 1936
- Phrynobatrachus bullans Crutsinger, Pickersgill, Channing, and Moyer, 2004
- Phrynobatrachus calcaratus (Peters, 1863)
- Phrynobatrachus chukuchuku Zimkus, 2009
- Phrynobatrachus congicus (Ahl, 1925)
- Phrynobatrachus cornutus (Boulenger, 1906)
- Phrynobatrachus cricogaster Perret, 1957
- Phrynobatrachus cryptotis Schmidt and Inger, 1959
- Phrynobatrachus dalcqi Laurent, 1952
- Phrynobatrachus danko Blackburn, 2010
- Phrynobatrachus dendrobates (Boulenger, 1919)
- Phrynobatrachus discogularis Pickersgill, Zimkus, and Raw, 2017
- Phrynobatrachus dispar (Peters, 1870)
- Phrynobatrachus elberti (Ahl, 1925)
- Phrynobatrachus francisci Boulenger, 1912
- Phrynobatrachus fraterculus (Chabanaud, 1921)
- Phrynobatrachus gastoni Barbour and Loveridge, 1928
- Phrynobatrachus ghanensis Schiøtz, 1964
- Phrynobatrachus giorgii De Witte, 1921
- Phrynobatrachus graueri (Nieden, 1911)
- Phrynobatrachus guineensis Guibé and Lamotte, 1962
- Phrynobatrachus gutturosus (Chabanaud, 1921)
- Phrynobatrachus hieroglyphicus Rödel, Ohler, and Hillers, 2010
- Phrynobatrachus horsti Rödel, Burger, Zassi-Boufou, Emmrich, Penner, and Barej, 2015
- Phrynobatrachus hylaios Perret, 1959
- Phrynobatrachus inexpectatus Largen, 2001
- Phrynobatrachus intermedius Rödel, Boateng, Penner, and Hillers, 2009
- Phrynobatrachus irangi Drewes and Perret, 2000
- Phrynobatrachus jimzimkusi Zimkus, Gvoždík, and Gonwouo, 2013
- Phrynobatrachus kakamikro Schick, Zimkus, Channing, Köhler, and Lötters, 2010
- Phrynobatrachus keniensis Barbour and Loveridge, 1928
- Phrynobatrachus kinangopensis Angel, 1924
- Phrynobatrachus krefftii Boulenger, 1909
- Phrynobatrachus latifrons Ahl, 1924
- Phrynobatrachus leveleve Uyeda, Drewes, and Zimkus, 2007
- Phrynobatrachus liberiensis Barbour and Loveridge, 1927
- Phrynobatrachus mababiensis FitzSimons, 1932
- Phrynobatrachus maculiventris Guibé and Lamotte, 1958
- Phrynobatrachus manengoubensis (Angel, 1940)
- Phrynobatrachus mayokoensis Rödel, Burger, Zassi-Boulou, Emmrich, Penner, and Barej, 2015
- Phrynobatrachus mbabo Gvoždík, Nečas, Dolinay, Zimkus, Schmitz, and Fokam, 2020
- Phrynobatrachus minutus (Boulenger, 1895)
- Phrynobatrachus nanus (Ahl, 1925)
- Phrynobatrachus natalensis (Smith, 1849)
- Phrynobatrachus njiomock Zimkus and Gvoždík, 2013
- Phrynobatrachus ogoensis (Boulenger, 1906)
- Phrynobatrachus pakenhami Loveridge, 1941
- Phrynobatrachus pallidus Pickersgill, 2007
- Phrynobatrachus parkeri De Witte, 1933
- Phrynobatrachus parvulus (Boulenger, 1905)
- Phrynobatrachus perpalmatus Boulenger, 1898
- Phrynobatrachus petropedetoides Ahl, 1924
- Phrynobatrachus phyllophilus Rödel and Ernst, 2002
- Phrynobatrachus pintoi Hillers, Zimkus, and Rödel, 2008
- Phrynobatrachus plicatus (Günther, 1858)
- Phrynobatrachus pygmaeus (Ahl, 1925)
- Phrynobatrachus rainerguentheri Rödel, Onadeko, Barej, and Sandberger, 2012
- Phrynobatrachus rouxi (Nieden, 1912)
- Phrynobatrachus rungwensis (Loveridge, 1932)
- Phrynobatrachus ruthbeateae Rödel, Doherty-Bone, Kouete, Janzen, Garrett, Browne, Gonwouo, Barej, and Sandberger, 2012
- Phrynobatrachus sandersoni (Parker, 1935)
- Phrynobatrachus scapularis (De Witte, 1933)
- Phrynobatrachus scheffleri (Nieden, 1911)
- Phrynobatrachus schioetzi Blackburn and Rödel, 2011
- Phrynobatrachus steindachneri Nieden, 1910
- Phrynobatrachus sternfeldi (Ahl, 1924)
- Phrynobatrachus stewartae Poynton and Broadley, 1985
- Phrynobatrachus sulfureogularis Laurent, 1951
- Phrynobatrachus taiensis Perret, 1988
- Phrynobatrachus tanoeensis Kpan, Kouamé, Barej, Adeba, Emmrich, Boateng, and Rödel, 2018
- Phrynobatrachus tokba (Chabanaud, 1921)
- Phrynobatrachus ukingensis (Loveridge, 1932)
- Phrynobatrachus ungujae Pickersgill, 2007
- Phrynobatrachus uzungwensis Grandison and Howell, 1983
- Phrynobatrachus versicolor Ahl, 1924
- Phrynobatrachus villiersi Guibé, 1959
- Phrynobatrachus werneri (Nieden, 1910)
