= Phrynobatrachus tokba =

Conservation status
- Least Concern (IUCN 3.1)

Scientific classification
- Kingdom: Animalia
- Phylum: Chordata
- Class: Amphibia
- Order: Anura
- Family: Phrynobatrachidae
- Genus: Phrynobatrachus
- Species: P. tokba

Binomial name
- Phrynobatrachus tokba (Chabanaud, 1921)

Synonyms
- Arthroleptis tokba Chabanaud, 1921; Phrynobatrachus alticola Guibé and Lamotte, "1961" 1962

Species of frog

Phrynobatrachus tokba is a species of frog in the family Phrynobatrachidae. It is found in West Africa from Ghana westward to Côte d'Ivoire, Liberia, Guinea, Sierra Leone, and Guinea-Bissau. Common names Tokba river frog, Tokba puddle frog, and—when referring to the formerly recognized Phrynobatrachus alticola, forest river frog—have been proposed for it.

== Description ==
Males grow to 15 mm (0.6 in) and females to 18 mm (0.7 in) in snout–vent length. The fingers and toes lack terminal discs and interdigital webbing. The dorsum is smooth to slightly warty, with three pairs of scapular warts, sometimes fusing into ridges. Coloration is variable; the dorsum is brown with or without red or green stripes or bands, or it is green or copper-red. The venter is white and may have grey marbling. Males have a smooth, grey throat.

The male advertisement call consists of one to few "krck"-sounds.

== Habitat and conservation ==
Phrynobatrachus tokba is primarily associated with degraded and open parts of primary forest, secondary forests with a broken canopy, and heavily degraded former forest (farm bush), but it can also occur in moist savanna and montane grassland during the rainy season. It occurs at elevations less than 1,600 m (5,200 ft) above sea level. It is a diurnal species found in leaf litter or grass tufts, sometimes sleeping on low vegetation at night. Development is direct (i.e., there is no free-living larval stage), and up to 25 eggs are deposited on the ground, with the larvae developing in a gelatinous mass.

Phrynobatrachus tokba is a very common species. It is somewhat adaptable, but changes that lead to a near-complete opening of the landscape (agricultural expansion, logging, and human settlements) are a threat to it. It is probably present in many protected areas.
