= Phrynobatrachus dendrobates =

Conservation status
- Least Concern (IUCN 3.1)

Scientific classification
- Kingdom: Animalia
- Phylum: Chordata
- Class: Amphibia
- Order: Anura
- Family: Phrynobatrachidae
- Genus: Phrynobatrachus
- Species: P. dendrobates

Binomial name
- Phrynobatrachus dendrobates (Boulenger, 1919)

Synonyms
- Phrynobatrachus petropedetoides Ahl, 1924

Species of amphibian

Phrynobatrachus dendrobates is a species of frogs in the family Phrynobatrachidae.

It is found in Democratic Republic of the Congo, Uganda, and possibly Tanzania. Its natural habitats are subtropical or tropical moist montane forest and rivers. It is threatened by habitat loss.
