= Phrynobatrachus ukingensis =

Conservation status
- Least Concern (IUCN 3.1)

Scientific classification
- Kingdom: Animalia
- Phylum: Chordata
- Class: Amphibia
- Order: Anura
- Family: Phrynobatrachidae
- Genus: Phrynobatrachus
- Species: P. ukingensis

Binomial name
- Phrynobatrachus ukingensis (Loveridge, 1932)

Synonyms
- Arthroleptis ukingensis Loveridge, 1932

Species of amphibian

Phrynobatrachus ukingensis is a species of frog in the family Phrynobatrachidae. It is recorded in several places in southern and eastern Tanzania and in northern and southern Malawi (Ukinga and Rungwe mountains in the southern Tanzania and the Uluguru Mountains in the east; the Misuku Mountains and Nchenachena in northern Malawi, and Maroka in the highlands southwest of the Zomba Massif in southern Malawi); it probably occurs more widely, at least in areas in between the known localities. Common names Ukinga puddle frog and Ukinga river frog have been coined for it.

== Description ==
Phrynobatrachus ukingensis is a small species; males grow to 19 mm (0.7 in) and females to 21 mm (0.8 in) in snout–vent length. The snout is moderate. The tympanum is hidden. The finger and toe tips are dilated into small but distinct discs. The toes have reduced webbing. The dorsum is mainly brown or olive and minutely mottled with dusky brown. A light vertebral line may be present, with similar lines on the thighs and tibiae. There is a continuous, light sub-tympanic band, extending from the lower eyelid to the base of the arm, typically bordered by an irregular dark band. The posterior parts of the venter are largely transparent. Females have dusky specklings or freckling on the throat; this may extend to the breast. Males have dusky to black throat and a cream-color patch across the belly at the midbody; when deflated, the vocal sac often forms a transverse fold.

== Habitat and conservation ==
This species occurs in montane forests, forest edges, and open montane grasslands at elevations of 1,000–2,000 m (3,300–6,600 ft) above sea level, perhaps somewhat higher. It seems to be associated with marshy areas. Males call hidden in the base of grasses near pools and other small water bodies; the eggs are laid in water and float on the surface.

Phrynobatrachus ukingensis is threatened by habitat loss caused by agricultural expansion, wood extraction, and expanding human settlements. It occurs in a number of protected areas, including the Kitulo National Park in southern Tanzania.
