= Phrynobatrachus villiersi =

Conservation status
- Least Concern (IUCN 3.1)

Scientific classification
- Kingdom: Animalia
- Phylum: Chordata
- Class: Amphibia
- Order: Anura
- Family: Phrynobatrachidae
- Genus: Phrynobatrachus
- Species: P. villiersi

Binomial name
- Phrynobatrachus villiersi Guibé, 1959

Species of frog

Phrynobatrachus villiersi is a species of frog in the family Phrynobatrachidae. It is found in southeastern Liberia, southern Côte d'Ivoire, and southwestern Ghana. Its natural habitat is tropical primary forest. The eggs are deposited on dried-up puddles just before the rains. It is very common in suitable habitat, but threatened by habitat loss caused by agriculture, logging, and human settlement.
