= Phrynobatrachus gutturosus =

Conservation status
- Least Concern (IUCN 3.1)

Scientific classification
- Kingdom: Animalia
- Phylum: Chordata
- Class: Amphibia
- Order: Anura
- Family: Phrynobatrachidae
- Genus: Phrynobatrachus
- Species: P. gutturosus

Binomial name
- Phrynobatrachus gutturosus (Chabanaud, 1921)

Species of amphibian

Phrynobatrachus gutturosus, the Chabanaud's river frog or guttural puddle frog, is a species of frog in the family Petropedetidae. It is found in Democratic Republic of the Congo, Ivory Coast, Ghana, Liberia, Nigeria, possibly Benin, possibly Burkina Faso, possibly Guinea, possibly Mali, possibly Togo, and possibly Uganda. Its natural habitats are subtropical or tropical moist lowland forest, moist savanna, swampland, and intermittent freshwater marshes. It is threatened by habitat loss.

== Description ==
The guttural puddle frog is a small frog with a pointed snout and warty skin, growing to a snout-to-vent length of about 14 to 16 mm (0.6 to 0.6 in) for males and 17 to 19 mm (0.7 to 0.7 in). The digits do not have enlarged tips and the fingers are unwebbed. The dorsal surface is greenish or brownish with dark blotches, sometimes bordered with black. The limbs are barred with green and the underparts are whitish. The male has a black vocal sac on the throat and the female has a black patch spotted with white on the throat.

== Distribution and habitat ==
The guttural puddle frog is native to the eastern part of Liberia, Côte d'Ivoire, Ghana, Togo, Benin and Nigeria and an isolated population is found in the Virunga National Park in the Democratic Republic of the Congo. Its natural habitat is rain forest where it is usually found near ponds and other water bodies and during the rainy season it may be found in gallery forest and temporary savannah swamps.

== Behaviour ==
The guttural puddle frog is a terrestrial species and is active by day in the rainy season but it hides under stones or logs by day and feeds by night during the dry season. During the breeding season, the males call near suitable water bodies and the females lay clutches of eggs in these. The eggs and young tadpoles are little studied but the tadpole growth is fast and the animals become mature at four to five months. They have a short lifespan and probably die within a few months of spawning.

== Status ==
The guttural puddle frog is listed by the IUCN as being of "Least Concern" as it is a common and adaptable species with a very wide range and its numbers appear to be relatively stable.
