= Phrynobatrachus francisci =

Conservation status
- Least Concern (IUCN 3.1)

Scientific classification
- Kingdom: Animalia
- Phylum: Chordata
- Class: Amphibia
- Order: Anura
- Family: Phrynobatrachidae
- Genus: Phrynobatrachus
- Species: P. francisci

Binomial name
- Phrynobatrachus francisci Boulenger, 1912

Synonyms
- Phrynobatrachus Monodi de Witte, 1930

Species of frog

Phrynobatrachus francisci is a species of frog in the family Phrynobatrachidae. It is widespread in the Guinean savanna zone of West Africa, from Senegal and southern Mauritania in the west to Nigeria in the east. The specific name francisci honours A. C. Francis, a colonial administrator in Nigeria and the collector of the holotype. Common names Francis's puddle frog and warty river frog has been proposed for it.

== Description ==
Adult males measure 15–23 mm (0.6–0.9 in) and adult females 19–28 mm (0.7–1.1 in) in snout–vent length. The body is stocky. The snout is short and pointed. The tympanum is reduced but the supratympanic fold is distinct. The toes have some webbing. The dorsum has very prominent warts whereas the flanks have small glandular warts. The dorsal colouration is brown, with some specimens having dark, light, irregularly shaped spots. The dorsal parts of the limbs have dark and light transverse bars; the back of the thigh has light brown longitudinal bands. The throat, chest, belly, and underside of the thigh are whitish; some females and juveniles have brown spots in their throat. Males have a subgular vocal sac and are darker than females.

== Habitat and ecology ==
Phrynobatrachus francisci is a very common species that inhabits both humid and dry savanna. It also lives in altered habitats including agricultural areas and villages. Breeding takes place in a range of temporary water habitats, including small temporary ponds and puddles and ditches.

Phrynobatrachus francisci are parasitized by intradermal larvae of the chigger mite Endotrombicula pillersi (family Trombiculidae). In the Comoé National Park (Ivory Coast), more than half of the Phrynobatrachus francisci individuals were infected, whereas other amphibians were not infected – except for a single Sclerophrys maculata. Only the most heavily infested frogs showed pathological effects of mites.
