= Phrynobatrachus intermedius =

Scientific classification
- Kingdom: Animalia
- Phylum: Chordata
- Class: Amphibia
- Order: Anura
- Family: Phrynobatrachidae
- Genus: Phrynobatrachus
- Species: P. intermedius

Binomial name
- Phrynobatrachus intermedius Rödel, Ofori-Boateng, Penner, & Hillers, 2009

Endangered species of Ghanaian amphibian

Phrynobatrachus intermedius, the intermediate puddle frog, is a critically endangered amphibian species found only in the Ankasa Conservation Area in southwestern Ghana. It is recognized as a high-priority EDGE species, diverging from other amphibians around 90 million years ago

== Physical characteristics ==
The intermediate puddle frog features a distinct dark brown color, which some say resembles a Zorro mask, a white belly with small blackish spots, and a snout-vent length typically between 20 and 30 millimeters.

== Habitat and diet ==
Intermediate puddle frogs inhabit swampy areas of primary rainforests and rely heavily on undisturbed raffia palm areas and the humid leaf litter surrounding these swamp sites. Like other members of the Phrynobatrachus genus, it is believed to utilize shallow, temporary water bodies, such as seasonal puddles and forest ponds, to deposit surface clutches of small eggs.

The diet of Phrynobatrachus intermedius can be inferred from its genus, as there are few to no specific dietary studies on it. Because the intermediate puddle frog is a relatively small leaf-litter and swamp-dwelling frog, its diet consists of any live terrestrial arthropods small enough to fit into its mouth. Its diet includes small ants, termites, beetles, flies, midges, spiders, cockroaches, grasshoppers, butterflies, worms, and more.

== Threats ==
In their native West African swamp forest habitat, puddle frogs are routinely preyed upon by semi-aquatic and forest-dwelling snakes, wading birds, and larger predatory invertebrates or fish during their tadpole stage. They are also threatened by humans due to illegal harvesting of Raffia palm trees for sap extraction, agricultural encroachment by cocoa farmers, and being used for fishing bait.
