= Phrynobatrachus alleni =

Conservation status
- Least Concern (IUCN 3.1)

Scientific classification
- Kingdom: Animalia
- Phylum: Chordata
- Class: Amphibia
- Order: Anura
- Family: Phrynobatrachidae
- Genus: Phrynobatrachus
- Species: P. alleni

Binomial name
- Phrynobatrachus alleni Parker, 1936

Species of frog

Phrynobatrachus alleni is a species of frog in the family Phrynobatrachidae. It is found in Ivory Coast, Ghana, Guinea, Liberia, Nigeria, and Sierra Leone. Its natural habitats are subtropical or tropical moist lowland forest and intermittent freshwater marshes. It is threatened by habitat loss.
