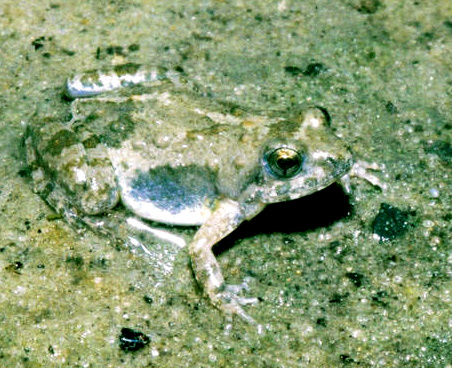

Conservation status
- Least Concern (IUCN 3.1)

Scientific classification
- Kingdom: Animalia
- Phylum: Chordata
- Class: Amphibia
- Order: Anura
- Family: Phrynobatrachidae
- Genus: Phrynobatrachus
- Species: P. mababiensis

Binomial name
- Phrynobatrachus mababiensis FitzSimons, 1932

= Phrynobatrachus mababiensis =

Species of amphibian

Phrynobatrachus mababiensis or the Mababe puddle frog is a species of frog in the family Phrynobatrachidae. It is found in Angola, Botswana, Democratic Republic of the Congo, Eswatini, Kenya, Malawi, Mozambique, Namibia, South Africa, Tanzania, Zambia, Zimbabwe, possibly Ethiopia, possibly Sudan, and possibly Uganda.

== Habitat ==
It is found most commonly in subtropical or tropical dry shrubland, subtropical or tropical moist shrubland, subtropical or tropical dry lowland grassland, subtropical or tropical seasonally wet or flooded lowland grassland, rivers, swampland, freshwater lakes, intermittent freshwater lakes, freshwater marshes, intermittent freshwater marshes.

It is able to survive in agricultural lands, rural gardens, water storage areas, ponds, seasonally flooded agricultural land, and canals and ditches.

== Conservation status ==
The Mababe puddle frog is a common and widespread species an adaptable species. There are no reports of it being harvested and is not facing any significant threats.
