= Phrynobatrachus werneri =

Conservation status
- Least Concern (IUCN 3.1)

Scientific classification
- Kingdom: Animalia
- Phylum: Chordata
- Class: Amphibia
- Order: Anura
- Family: Phrynobatrachidae
- Genus: Phrynobatrachus
- Species: P. werneri

Binomial name
- Phrynobatrachus werneri (Nieden, 1910)

Synonyms
- Arthroleptis werneri Nieden, 1910; Pseudarthroleptis werneri (Nieden, 1910)

Species of frog

Phrynobatrachus werneri is a species of frog in the family Phrynobatrachidae. It is only known with certainty from western Cameroon, although there is a putative record from Chappal Waddi in Nigeria, close to the border of Cameroon; the earlier record from the Obudu Plateau in Nigeria is now assigned to Phrynobatrachus schioetzi described as a new species in 2011. The status of Phrynobatrachus manengoubensis from Mount Manengouba remains unclear, with some questioning its distinctness from Phrynobatrachus werneri. Common name Werner's river frog has been coined for this species.

== Etymology ==
The specific name werneri honours Franz Werner, an Austrian explorer, zoologist, and herpetologist.

== Description ==
Phrynobatrachus werneri is a small species measuring 16–23 mm (0.6–0.9 in) in snout–vent length; Blackburn and Rödel (2011) give range 17–22 mm (0.7–0.9 in) for adult males. The tympanum is distinct. The tips of the digits are widened or expanded into small discs. The toes have no or only rudimentary webbing. The tympanic region is dark and shows a supratypanic ridge. Females are pale ventrally. Males have a black throat and some darker pigmentation on the chest and anterior of the belly.

== Habitat and conservation ==
Phrynobatrachus werneri is found in and around small bodies of water such as streams, roadside ditches, Raphia swamps and marshes in submontane and montane forest and grassland landscapes. It tolerates habitat alteration. Breeding takes place in still water, including marshes.

It is a common and adaptable species that is not at serious risk from habitat change. It might occur in the Bafut-Ngemba Forest Reserve.
