= Phrynobatrachus graueri =

Conservation status
- Least Concern (IUCN 3.1)

Scientific classification
- Kingdom: Animalia
- Phylum: Chordata
- Class: Amphibia
- Order: Anura
- Family: Phrynobatrachidae
- Genus: Phrynobatrachus
- Species: P. graueri

Binomial name
- Phrynobatrachus graueri (Nieden, 1911)

Synonyms
- Arthroleptis graueri Nieden, 1911 "1910"; Hylarthroleptis graueri (Nieden, 1911)

Species of frog

Phrynobatrachus graueri is a species of frog in the family Phrynobatrachidae. It is found in eastern Democratic Republic of the Congo, Rwanda, Uganda, and western Kenya. The specific name graueri honours Rudolf Grauer, Austrian explorer and zoologist who collected the holotype. Common names Rugege river frog and Grauer's puddle frog have been coined for it.

== Description ==
Adult males can grow to 23 mm (0.9 in) and adult females 28 mm (1.1 in) in snout–vent length. The snout is short. The tympanum is distinct and about one-half of the eye width. The fingers and toes have distinct discs. The toes are slightly webbed. The dorsum is dark olive. A darker band runs from the nostril to the forearm. There might be a narrow or wide vertebral stripe. A pair of light lines are flanking the vent. Males have black throat. The base of the hind limb is often yellow.

== Habitat and conservation ==
Phrynobatrachus graueri occurs in montane forest interior and edges at elevations greater than 1,000 m (3,300 ft), often in association with swampy forest. The eggs are deposited in water, generally in swampy situations. Where present, it is a common species. It is probably affected by habitat loss caused by agriculture, livestock, wood extraction, and human settlements. It is present in the Kibale and Bwindi National Parks in Uganda and Kakamega National Reserve in Kenya.
