= Phrynobatrachus annulatus =

Conservation status
- Least Concern (IUCN 3.1)

Scientific classification
- Kingdom: Animalia
- Phylum: Chordata
- Class: Amphibia
- Order: Anura
- Family: Phrynobatrachidae
- Genus: Phrynobatrachus
- Species: P. annulatus

Binomial name
- Phrynobatrachus annulatus Perret, 1966

Species of frog

Phrynobatrachus annulatus is a species of frog in the family Phrynobatrachidae. It is found in Ivory Coast, Ghana, Guinea, and Liberia. Its natural habitat is subtropical or tropical moist lowland forest. It is threatened by habitat loss.
