= Phrynobatrachus liberiensis =

Conservation status
- Least Concern (IUCN 3.1)

Scientific classification
- Kingdom: Animalia
- Phylum: Chordata
- Class: Amphibia
- Order: Anura
- Family: Phrynobatrachidae
- Genus: Phrynobatrachus
- Species: P. liberiensis

Binomial name
- Phrynobatrachus liberiensis (Barbour & Loveridge, 1927)

Species of frog

Phrynobatrachus liberiensis is a species of frog in the family Petropedetidae. It is found in Côte d'Ivoire, Ghana, Guinea, Liberia, and Sierra Leone.

Its natural habitats are subtropical or tropical moist lowland forest, subtropical or tropical moist montane forest, rivers, and swampland. It is threatened by habitat loss.
