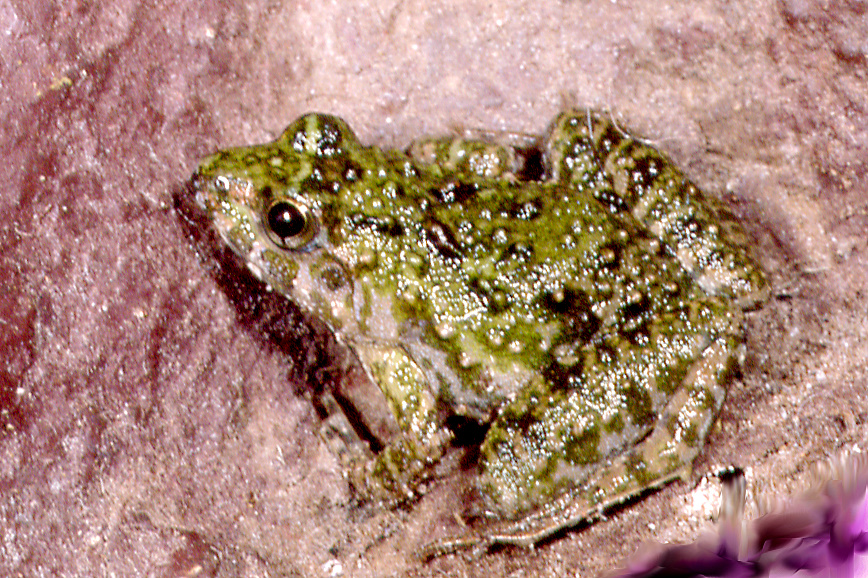

Conservation status
- Least Concern (IUCN 3.1)

Scientific classification
- Kingdom: Animalia
- Phylum: Chordata
- Class: Amphibia
- Order: Anura
- Family: Phrynobatrachidae
- Genus: Phrynobatrachus
- Species: P. natalensis

Binomial name
- Phrynobatrachus natalensis (Smith, 1849)

Synonyms
- Phrynobatrachus bottegi (Boulenger, 1894); Phrynobatrachus sciangallarum (Scortecci, 1943); Phrynobatrachus zavattarii (Scortecci, 1943)

= Natal dwarf puddle frog =

Species of amphibian

The Natal dwarf puddle frog (Phrynobatrachus natalensis) is a species of frog in the family Phrynobatrachidae. It is found in Angola, Benin, Botswana, Burundi, Cameroon, Central African Republic, Republic of the Congo, Democratic Republic of the Congo, Ivory Coast, Eswatini, Eritrea, Ethiopia, Gambia, Ghana, Guinea, Guinea-Bissau, Kenya, Liberia, Malawi, Mali, Mozambique, Namibia, Nigeria, Rwanda, Senegal, Sierra Leone, South Africa, Sudan, Tanzania, Togo, Uganda, Zambia, Zimbabwe, and possibly Burkina Faso, Chad, Lesotho, and Mauritania.

Its natural habitats are subtropical or tropical dry forest, subtropical or tropical moist lowland forest, subtropical or tropical moist montane forest, dry savanna, moist savanna, subtropical or tropical dry shrubland, subtropical or tropical moist shrubland, subtropical or tropical dry lowland grassland, subtropical or tropical seasonally wet or flooded lowland grassland, subtropical or tropical high-altitude grassland, rivers, intermittent rivers, swamps, freshwater lakes, freshwater marshes, intermittent freshwater marshes, arable land, pastureland, rural gardens, urban areas, heavily degraded former forest, ponds, and seasonally flooded agricultural land.

== Description ==
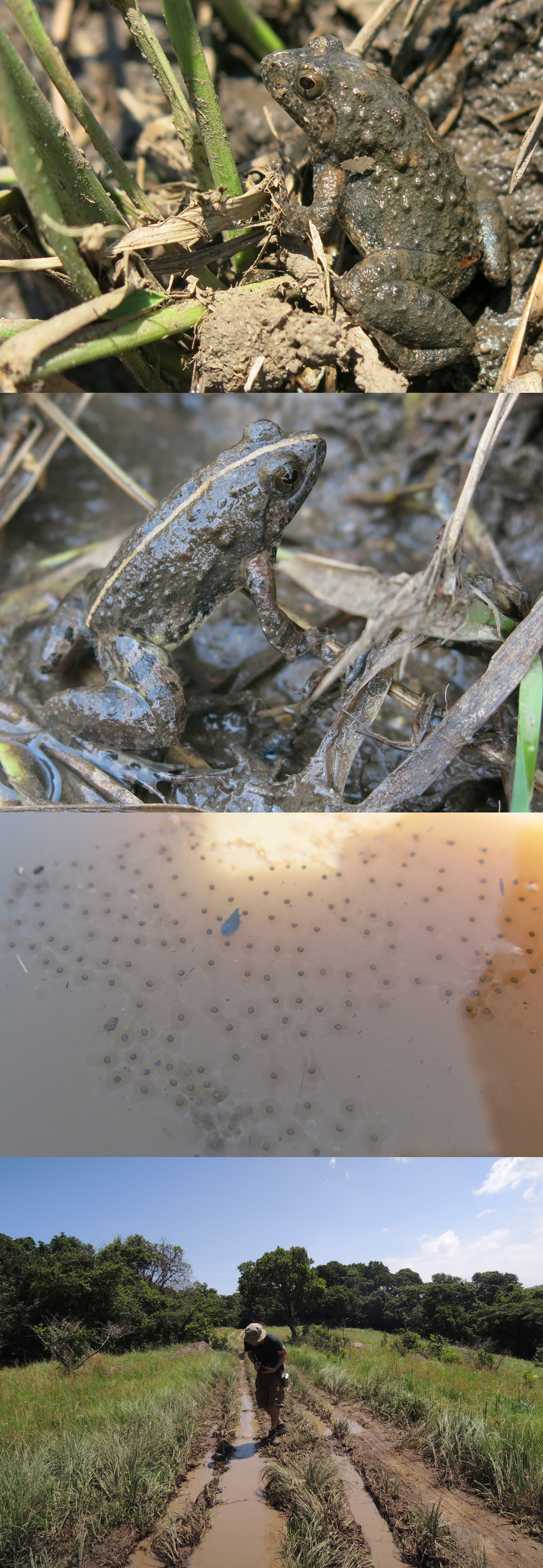
Habitat, eggs and two colour variations of Phrynobatrachus natalensis, Ngoye Forest, KwaZulu Natal, South Africa

The Natal dwarf puddle frog is a small frog with a rounded snout and warty skin, growing to a snout-to-vent length of about 25 to 31 mm (1.0 to 1.2 in). The digits do not have enlarged tips and the fingers are unwebbed. It has a uniformly coloured greenish or brownish dorsal surface, slightly darker around the warts, and a whitish belly. The male has a prominent white-spotted, black vocal sac on the throat during the breeding season.

== Behaviour ==
The Natal dwarf puddle frog feeds on a variety of invertebrates including beetles, termites, bugs, flies, cockroaches, grasshoppers, butterflies and spiders. Termites may be the most-frequently eaten food item.

This frog breeds in the rainy season. At this time, males call and both sexes aggregate at ponds, streams, marshes, puddles, water accumulated in wheel ruts, pools and other wet locations. The eggs float and a clutch of several hundred form a raft on the surface and hatch about four days later. The tadpoles take about four to five weeks to develop to metamorphosis.

== Status ==
The Natal dwarf puddle frog is listed by the IUCN as being of "Least Concern" as it is an adaptable species with a very wide range and its numbers appear to be stable.
