= Ernst Ahl =

German zoologist (1898 - 1945)

Christoph Gustav Ernst Ahl (1 September 1898 – 14 February 1945) was a German zoologist, born in Berlin.

He was the director of the department of ichthyology and herpetology in the Museum für Naturkunde.

He was also the editor in chief of the review Das Aquarium from 1927 to 1934.

During World War II, Ahl fought in the ranks of the Wehrmacht – in Poland, North Africa, and later, Yugoslavia. He was executed while in refuge in Yugoslavia, after the partisans found out he was a German.

He performed one of the first studies on bearded dragons determining what genus they belong to.

Ahl is commemorated in the scientific names of two species of lizard: Anolis ahli and Emoia ahli. The latter is a synonym of Emoia battersbyi.

== See also ==
- Category:Taxa named by Ernst Ahl
