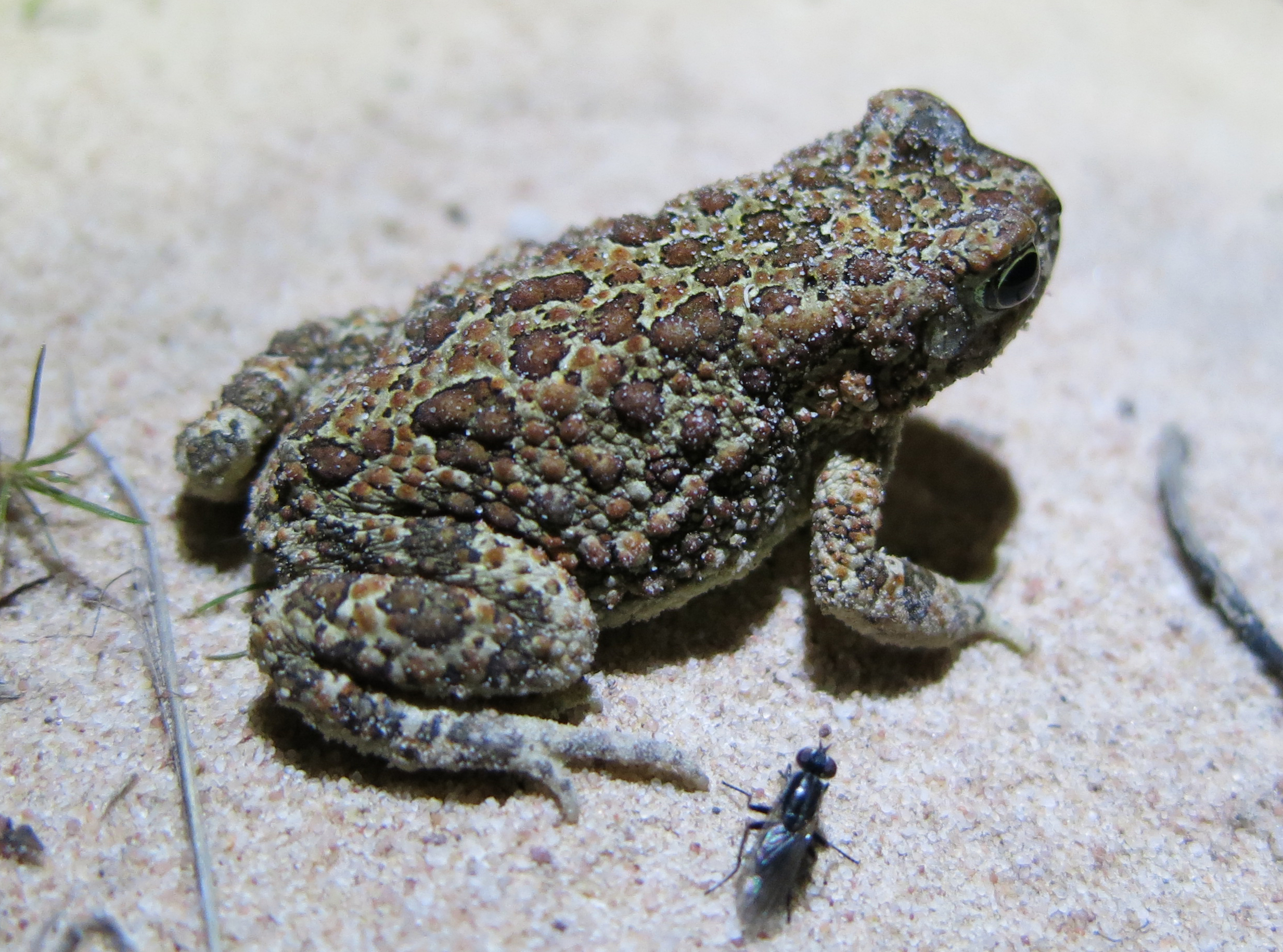
- Poyntonophrynus fenoulheti

Scientific classification
- Kingdom: Animalia
- Phylum: Chordata
- Class: Amphibia
- Order: Anura
- Family: Bufonidae
- Genus: Poyntonophrynus; Frost et al., 2006

Type species
- Bufo vertebralis Smith, 1848

Species
- 10 species (see text)

= Poyntonophrynus =

Genus of amphibians

Poyntonophrynus, also known as pygmy toads, are a genus consisting of ten true toad species native to Sub-Saharan Africa. Originally, all Poyntonophrynus species were included in the genus Bufo. The genus was split due to large enough taxonomic divergence as evidenced by molecular markers. The genus is named in honour of John Charles Poynton, South African herpetologist, with phrynus being Greek for toad.

== Taxonomy and systematics ==
Poyntonophrynus corresponds to the former Bufo vertebralis group. Poyntonophrynus is the sister taxon of Mertensophryne. Some molecular studies have suggested polyphyly of Poyntonophrynus, but the conclusion is likely to have been caused by sequences representing a different species than assumed.

== Description ==
Poyntonophrynus are small toads. They lack a tarsal fold, and their parotoid glands are indistinct and flattened. The tympanum is small but distinct.

== Species ==
The species in this genus are:

- Poyntonophrynus beiranus (Loveridge, 1932)
- Poyntonophrynus damaranus (Mertens, 1954)
- Poyntonophrynus dombensis (Bocage, 1895)
- Poyntonophrynus fenoulheti (Hewitt and Methuen, 1912)
- Poyntonophrynus grandisonae (Poynton and Haacke, 1993)
- Poyntonophrynus hoeschi (Ahl, 1934)
- Poyntonophrynus kavangensis (Poynton and Broadley, 1988)
- Poyntonophrynus lughensis (Loveridge, 1932)
- Poyntonophrynus pachnodes (Ceríaco, Marques, Bandeira, Agarwal, Stanley, Bauer, Heinicke, and Blackburn, 2018)
- Poyntonophrynus parkeri (Loveridge, 1932)
- Poyntonophrynus vertebralis (Smith, 1848)
- Poyntonophrynus fernandae (Baptista & Vaz Pinto & Keates & Lobón-Rovira & Edwards & Rödel, 2023)

Sclerophrys urunguensis likely belongs to this genus, but remains formally in Sclerophrys (former Amietophrynus).
