= Sclerophrys taiensis =

Conservation status
- Endangered (IUCN 3.1)

Scientific classification
- Kingdom: Animalia
- Phylum: Chordata
- Class: Amphibia
- Order: Anura
- Family: Bufonidae
- Genus: Sclerophrys
- Species: S. taiensis

Binomial name
- Sclerophrys taiensis (Rödel and Ernst, 2000)

Synonyms
- Bufo taiensis Rödel and Ernst, 2000; Bufo amieti Tandy and Perret, 2000; Amietophrynus taiensis (Rödel and Ernst, 2000)

Species of amphibian

Sclerophrys taiensis is a species of toad in the family Bufonidae. It is known from the Taï National Park (its type locality) in southwestern Ivory Coast and from the Gola Forest in southeastern Sierra Leone; it is likely that its range extends into the adjacent Liberia. Common name Tai toad (also rendered as Taï toad) has been proposed for it.

== Description ==
Males grow to 33 mm (1.3 in) and females to 38 mm (1.5 in) in snout–vent length. The body is compact and the snout is short. The eyes are relatively large. The parotoid glands are very large. Dorsal skin very warty with spiny tips, while ventrally skin is granular with many small spines. The toes have rudimentary webbing. Dorsal coloration is grey to brown with irregular black spots and streaks. The limbs have black crossbars. The venter is black with grey to blue-white spots.

== Habitat and conservation ==
Sclerophrys taiensis inhabits primary lowland rainforest close to forest streams. Breeding presumably takes place in streams (as in Sclerophrys tuberosa).

It is a rare species that even in well-studied areas (i.e., Taï National Park) is known from only a few specimens. It is threatened by forest loss caused by agriculture (cacao plantations, rubber, and oil palms), timber extraction, and human settlement (encroachment). The known populations are within national parks, but these require improved management and protection.
