= Sclerophrys asmarae =

Conservation status
- Least Concern (IUCN 3.1)

Scientific classification
- Kingdom: Animalia
- Phylum: Chordata
- Class: Amphibia
- Order: Anura
- Family: Bufonidae
- Genus: Sclerophrys
- Species: S. asmarae

Binomial name
- Sclerophrys asmarae (Tandy, Bogart, Largen, and Feener, 1982)

Synonyms
- Bufo asmarae Tandy, Bogart, Largen, and Feener, 1982; Amietophrynus asmarae (Tandy, Bogart, Largen, and Feener, 1982)

Species of amphibian

Sclerophrys asmarae, also known as the Asmara toad, is a species of toad in the family Bufonidae. It is named after its type locality, the capital city of Eritrea, Asmara. It is found on the Ethiopian Highlands on both sides of the Rift Valley, with the western population extending north into Eritrea. Its natural habitats are montane grasslands, and tentatively at lower elevations, arid savanna. It is a locally common and adaptable species that is impacted by habitat degradation, though probably without posing a serious risk.

== Taxonomy ==
Sclerophrys asmarae was first described from Ethiopia in 1982 by Tandy, Bogart, Largen, and Feener, who named it Bufo asmarae. It is one of only two known bisexual polyploid species of Bufo and has a karyotype of 2n=40. It seems to be closely related to Sclerophrys kerinyagae and the African common toad (Sclerophrys regularis) which are diploid species. The ranges of these three species overlap and because of its chromosome number, A. asmarae must have evolved from one or other of these species. Slight differences in voice and certain reproduction isolating mechanisms are evident between the three species. Further hybridisation is probably prevented by spatial constraints involving altitude preferences.

== Status ==
Sclerophrys asmarae is threatened primarily by human settlement and agriculture. However, it seems to be an adaptable species able to adapt to degradation of its grassland habitat by grazing. As habitat destruction is slow, and this species is common in some locations, the International Union for Conservation of Nature (IUCN) has assessed its conservation status as being of "least concern".
