= Sclerophrys djohongensis =

Conservation status
- Data Deficient (IUCN 3.1)

Scientific classification
- Kingdom: Animalia
- Phylum: Chordata
- Class: Amphibia
- Order: Anura
- Family: Bufonidae
- Genus: Sclerophrys
- Species: S. djohongensis

Binomial name
- Sclerophrys djohongensis (Hulselmans, 1977)

Synonyms
- Bufo funereus djohongensis Hulselmans, 1977; Bufo djohongensis Hulselmans, 1977; Amietophrynus djohongensis (Hulselmans, 1977)

Species of amphibian

Sclerophrys djohongensis is a species of toad in the family Bufonidae. It is endemic to the Adamawa Plateau in north-central Cameroon. It was originally described as a subspecies of Bufo funereus (now Sclerophrys funerea). It might even be a junior synonym of Sclerophrys villiersi.

The species' natural habitats are gallery forests in montane grassland and wooded savanna landscapes. A rarely recorded species, it probably suffers from habitat degradation caused by agriculture, overgrazing by livestock, wood extraction, fire, and human settlements.
