= Sclerophrys danielae =

Ivory Coast toad

Conservation status
- Data Deficient (IUCN 3.1)

Scientific classification
- Kingdom: Animalia
- Phylum: Chordata
- Class: Amphibia
- Order: Anura
- Family: Bufonidae
- Genus: Sclerophrys
- Species: S. danielae

Binomial name
- Sclerophrys danielae (Perret, 1977)

Synonyms
- Bufo danielae Perret, 1977; Amietophrynus danielae (Perret, 1977)

Species of amphibian

Sclerophrys danielae is a species of toad in the family Bufonidae. It is endemic to the southwest coast of Ivory Coast (Côte d'Ivoire) and only known from the vicinity of Monogaga, its type locality between Sassandra and San Pedro. Last seen in around 1977, Sclerophrys danielae is one of the frogs declared as "Lost" in 2010. Common name Ivory Coast toad has been coined for it.

== Etymology ==
This species was discovered by Dr Danièle Murith, who was a parasitologist working for the Swiss Center of Research in Ivory Coast. The specific name danielae was given in her honor.

== Description ==
Adult males measure 33–45 mm (1.3–1.8 in) and adult females 44–46 mm (1.7–1.8 in) in snout–vent length. The overall appearance is moderately slender. The tympanum is distinct. The parotoid glands are small but distinct. The toes are moderately webbed. The dorsal pattern consists of symmetrically arranged dark spots that can merge into larger blotches. These get almost hidden when the background color is earth-brown but are conspicuous against yellowish brown background; it appears that individuals can adjust their coloration to external conditions.

== Habitat and conservation ==
Sclerophrys danielae has been collected from two localities. In Monogaga, it was found in the coastal zone, amidst Panicum repens grass and low in and under Dalbergia ecastaphyllum bushes. In the inland locality near Sassandra, it was found in a flooded coconut plantation.

Despite surveys in the area, this species has not been observed, suggesting that it is very rare. Its range overlaps with the Monogaga Classified Forest, which is managed partly as a protected area, partly as an agricultural area where farmers are allowed to grow crops. Threats to this species are unknown.
