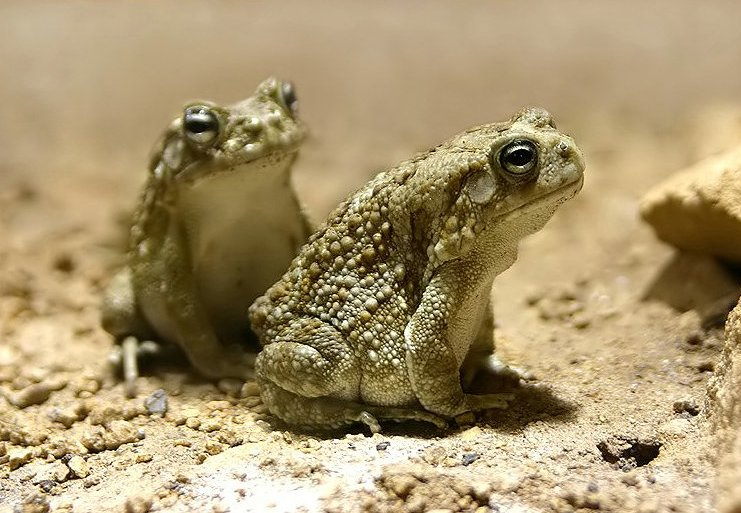

Conservation status
- Least Concern (IUCN 3.1)

Scientific classification
- Kingdom: Animalia
- Phylum: Chordata
- Class: Amphibia
- Order: Anura
- Family: Bufonidae
- Genus: Sclerophrys
- Species: S. regularis

Binomial name
- Sclerophrys regularis (Reuss, 1833)

Synonyms
- Bufo regularis Reuss, 1833; Amietophrynus regularis(Reuss, 1833)

= Sclerophrys regularis =

Species of amphibian

Sclerophrys regularis, commonly known as the African common toad, square-marked toad, African toad, Egyptian toad, African bouncing toad (due to the bouncing motion) and Reuss's toad, is a species of toad in the family Bufonidae. It is found widely in the Subsaharan Africa, with its range extending to the oases in Algeria and Libya as well as to northern Nilotic Egypt. Specifically, it is found in Angola, Benin, Burkina Faso, Cameroon, Cape Verde, Central African Republic, Chad, Republic of the Congo, Democratic Republic of the Congo, Ivory Coast, Egypt, Ethiopia, Gabon, Ghana, Guinea, Guinea-Bissau, Kenya, Liberia, Mali, Niger, Nigeria, Rwanda, Senegal, Sierra Leone, Sudan, and Uganda.

== Description ==
The African common toad is a large sturdy toad with a warty skin. Males grow to a snout-to-vent length of 62 to 91 mm (2.4 to 3.6 in) and females reach 70 to 130 mm (2.8 to 5.1 in). The paratoid glands are large and either parallel or kidney-shaped and the male has a single vocal sac under the chin. The dorsal surface is dark olive-brown with dark patches on the back, often arranged fairly symmetrically, and in younger animals, there is a paler band along the spine. There are smaller dark blotches on the upper lip and the eyelids, and the warts on the flanks are often separated by dark markings. The throats of males are black and the underparts of both sexes are white to beige. The call is a rattling sound made up of two pulses and lasting for about 0.9 second. When threatened, they would bounce to confuse (or escape) predators and would also move through water. They also have webbed hind feet to propel through water.

== Habitat ==
The African common toad is an abundant species found in both moist and dry savanna, montane grassland, forest margins, and agricultural habitats. It is often found near rivers, where it also breeds. It is not a forest species but in the forest zone it can still be found in degraded habitats and towns (including gardens). In drier areas it is replaced by other species such as Amietophrynus garmani and Amietophrynus xeros.

== Status ==
The African common toad is a common species across most of its wide range. It is an adaptable species and the population is stable so the International Union for Conservation of Nature has listed its conservation status as being of least concern. It has sometimes been exploited to the pet trade.

== In captivity ==
African common toads are popular as pets. Keeping 2 or more will require a minimum of a 20-gallon terrarium.
