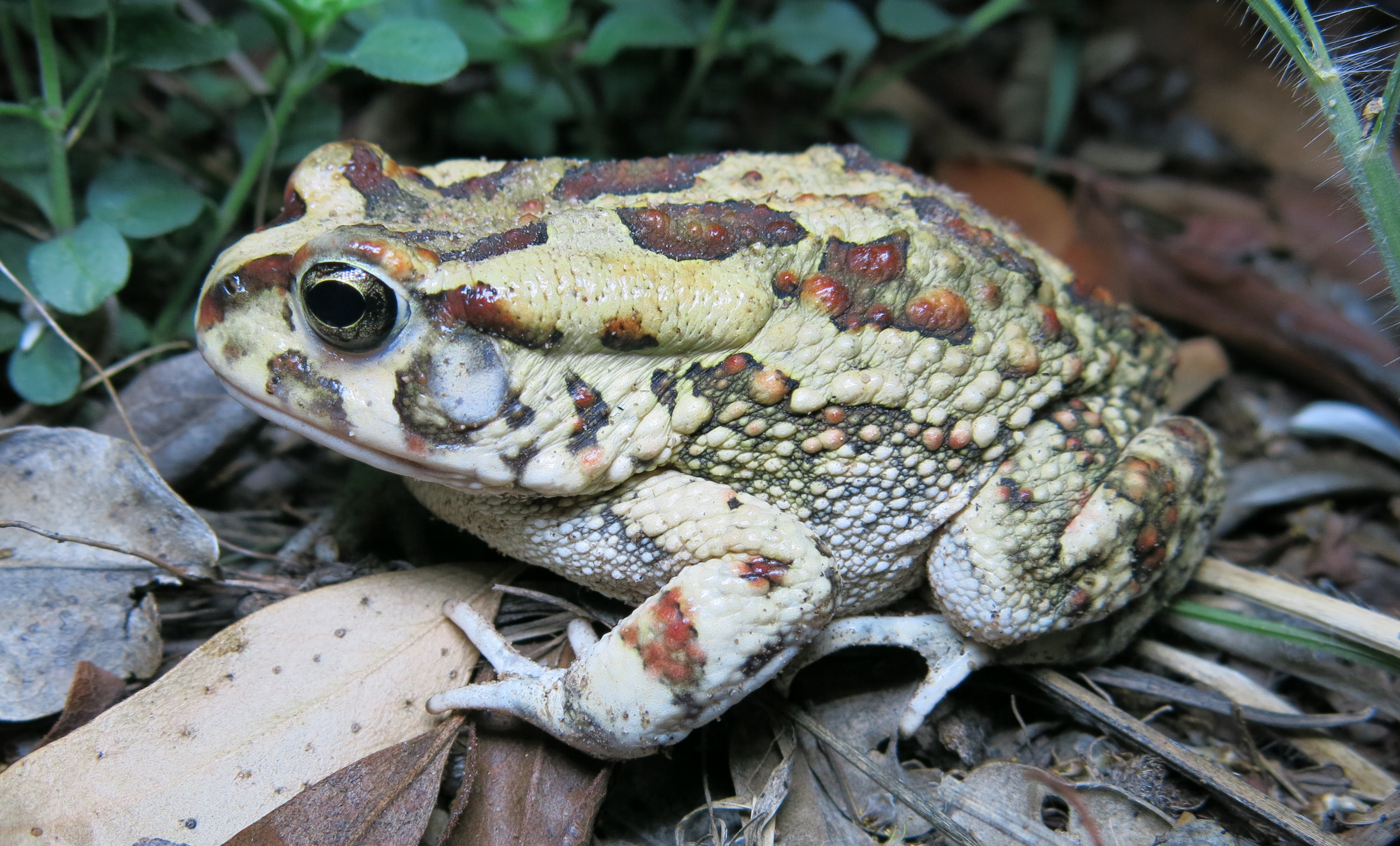

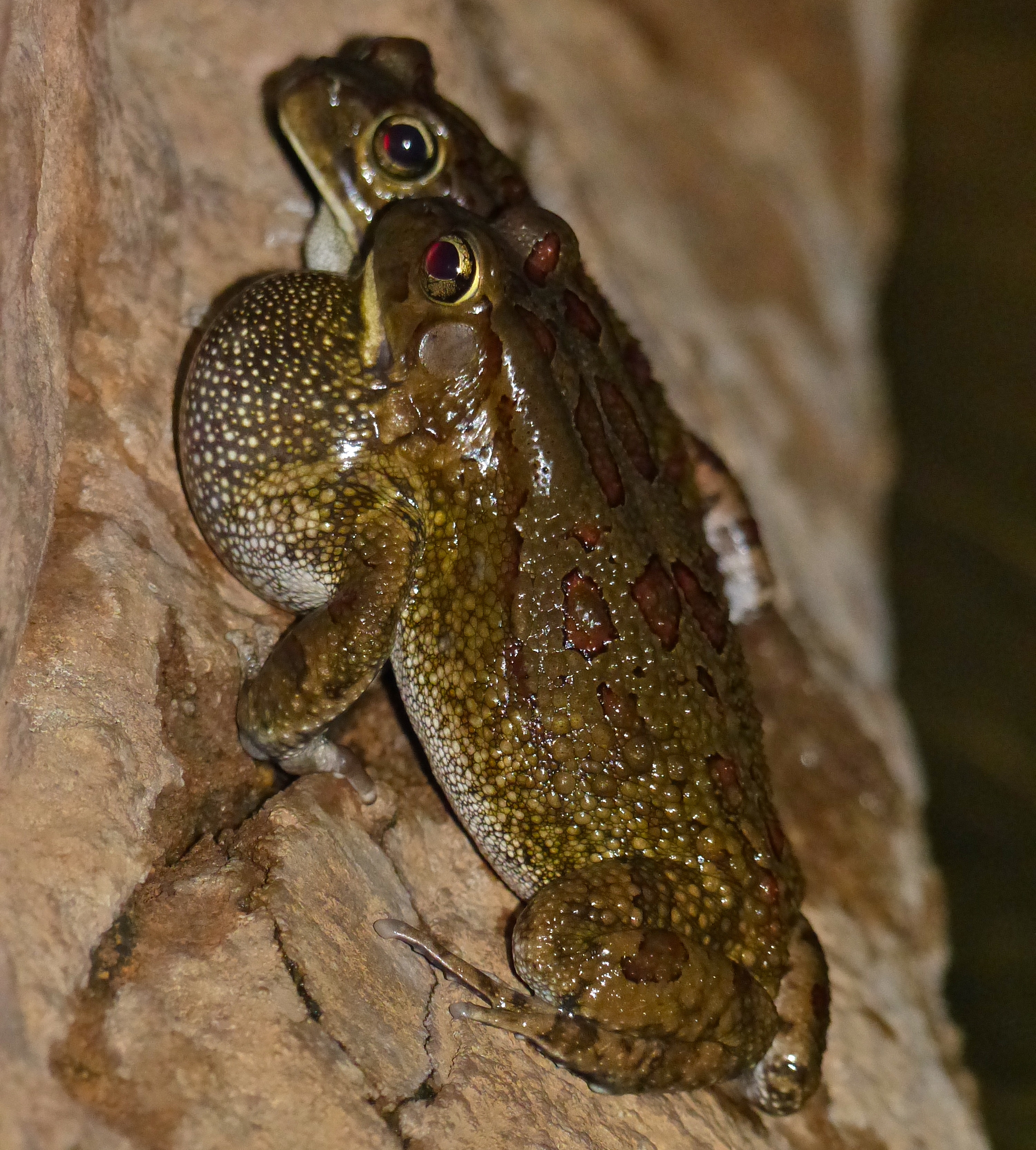
- A. garmani in Limpopo, South Africa

Conservation status
- Least Concern (IUCN 3.1)

Scientific classification
- Kingdom: Animalia
- Phylum: Chordata
- Class: Amphibia
- Order: Anura
- Family: Bufonidae
- Genus: Sclerophrys
- Species: S. garmani

Binomial name
- Sclerophrys garmani (Meek, 1897)

Synonyms
- Bufo garmani Meek, 1897; Amietophrynus garmani (Meek, 1897); Bufo regularis humbensis Monard, 1937 "1936"; Bufo pseudogarmani Hulselmans, 1969; Bufo bisidanae Hulselmans, 1977

= Sclerophrys garmani =

Species of amphibian

Sclerophrys garmani, also known as Garman's toad or eastern olive toad (among others), is a species of toad in the family Bufonidae. It is widely distributed in East and Southern Africa. However, populations north and south of Tanzania might represent distinct species. If so, the name Sclerophrys garmani would apply to populations from northeastern Africa. Furthermore, its southern boundary towards the range of Sclerophrys poweri in South Africa is also unclear.

== Etymology ==
The specific name garmani honors Samuel Garman, an American ichthyologist and herpetologist.

== Description ==
Males grow to 106 mm (4.2 in) and females to 115 mm (4.5 in) in snout–vent length. The tympanum is almost as big as the eye diameter. The parotoid glands are large. The back is tan to olive-brown and bears large paired markings edged with black. A thin vertebral stripe may be present. Dorsal skin has distinct warts that bear small, black spines. The ventrum is off-white.

The male advertisement call is a loud, low-pitched "kwaak", lasting for about a second.

== Range ==
The range extends from Ethiopia and Somalia southward through Kenya, Tanzania, Mozambique, Zambia, Zimbabwe, Botswana, to South Africa and Eswatini and west to Namibia and Angola.

== Habitat ==
Sclerophrys garmani in habits both arid and wooded savannas as well as agricultural areas at elevations below 2,000 m (6,600 ft). A Tanzanian population was found entirely in woodland areas. Breeding takes place in temporary water, sometimes also in artificial pools and rivers.

Sclerophrys garmani is common in parts of its range. It can be threatened by habitat loss caused by human expansion, settlement, and agricultural encroachment. However, it is an adaptable species that is not seriously at risk. It is present in many protected areas.
