= Poyntonophrynus parkeri =

Conservation status
- Least Concern (IUCN 3.1)

Scientific classification
- Kingdom: Animalia
- Phylum: Chordata
- Class: Amphibia
- Order: Anura
- Family: Bufonidae
- Genus: Poyntonophrynus
- Species: P. parkeri

Binomial name
- Poyntonophrynus parkeri (Loveridge, 1932)

Synonyms
- Bufo parkeri Loveridge, 1932

Species of amphibian

Poyntonophrynus parkeri (common names: Parker's toad, Mangasini toad) is a species of toad in the family Bufonidae. It is found in central Tanzania and in southwestern Kenya, from the Usangu Plain in the south northward to the southern Great Rift Valley, Kenya. It is a poorly known species, however, and its distribution might be broader.

== Etymology ==
The specific name parkeri honours Hampton Wildman Parker, an English zoologist and herpetologist from the Natural History Museum, London. Parker helped Loveridge by providing him a comparison with the type specimen of Bufo vittatus (now Sclerophrys vittata), convincing Loveridge that the specimens represented a new species.

== Description ==
Adult males measure 27–30 mm (1.1–1.2 in) and adult females 31–33 mm (1.2–1.3 in) in snout–vent length. The tympanum is vertically elongate. The dorsum is muddy black (similar to the soil on which they were found). There are ochre-coloured or very dull brownish red warts. In males, the throat is dull chrome, whereas in females, it is white, as are the rest of the underparts. In preserved specimens, a V-shaped interorbital marking becomes visible.

== Habitat and conservation ==
Poyntonophrynus parkeri inhabits sparsely wooded grassland, savanna, and flood plains. Breeding takes place in temporary pools. Threats to it are unknown, but it could be locally affected by overgrazing and human settlement. It is present in the Usangu Game Reserve.
