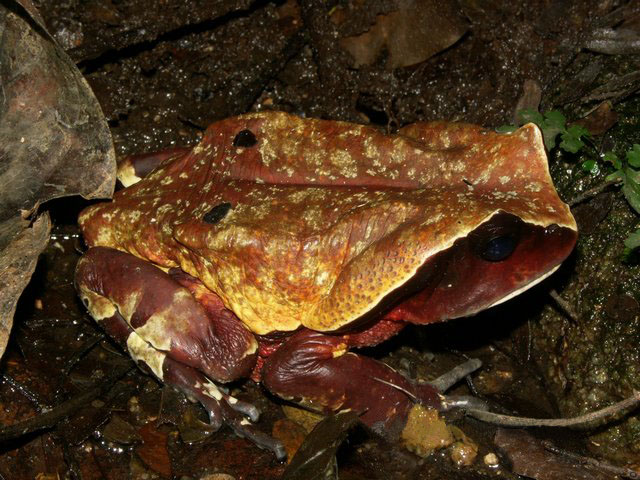

Conservation status
- Least Concern (IUCN 3.1)
- CITES Appendix I

Scientific classification
- Kingdom: Animalia
- Phylum: Chordata
- Class: Amphibia
- Order: Anura
- Family: Bufonidae
- Genus: Sclerophrys
- Species: S. superciliaris

Binomial name
- Sclerophrys superciliaris (Boulenger, 1888)

Synonyms
- Amietophrynus superciliaris (Boulenger, 1888); Bufo superciliaris Boulenger, 1888

= African giant toad =

Species of amphibian

The African giant toad, Congo toad, or Cameroon toad (Sclerophrys superciliaris) is a species of toad in the family Bufonidae. It is found in Cameroon, Central African Republic, Republic of the Congo, Democratic Republic of the Congo, Ivory Coast, Equatorial Guinea, Gabon, Ghana, Nigeria, possibly Liberia, and possibly Sierra Leone. The toad's natural habitats are subtropical or tropical moist lowland forests, freshwater marshes, intermittent freshwater marshes, plantations, and heavily degraded former forest. While it is a "least concern" species, it is threatened by habitat loss.

== Taxonomy ==
The African giant toad appears to be a species complex. Although it is found across western and central Africa, it does not have a single large area of occupancy but occurs in several separate populations. It has been proposed that the species should be divided into three separate taxa, two subspecies and a new species. The proposed subspecies are S. superciliaris superciliaris, found only in the western Lower Guinean forests extending along the eastern coast of the Gulf of Guinea from eastern Benin through Nigeria, Cameroon and Equatorial Guinea, and S. superciliaris chevalieri, found in the Upper Guinean forests of Sierra Leone, Guinea, Liberia, Ivory Coast and Ghana, and the new species, Sclerophrys channingi, found in the eastern part of the Democratic Republic of Congo. The latter species has been described as a Batesian mimic of the venomous Gaboon viper.

== Description ==
The African giant toad is a large species with a robust body which is a broad ovoid in shape. It has a short snout, an unridged crown and nearly-vertical sides to the head. The eyes are set close together and the upper eyelid has a pointed edge drawn out into a triangular projection. The tympanum is indistinct but the parotoid glands are large. The first finger of the hand is longer than the second one, males having nuptial pads on the first two fingers. On the hind limbs, the toes are short and partially webbed. The skin on the back is either smooth or may bear small warts. The upper surface of the head and body is pale brown, yellowish or pinkish. There is a backwards-pointing V-shaped black mark between the eyes and there are sometimes one or more pairs of dark spots on the back. There is sometimes a thin, pale stripe running along the spine. The sides of the head and body are considerably darker than the upper parts. The underparts are grey speckled with white and there is a thin white line bordering the lower jaw. The limbs are barred with dark bands on a greyish or brownish background and the back of the thigh, and sometimes the flanks, are bright red. The combined effect of this colouration is to make the frog resemble a dead leaf and it is well camouflaged when among the leaf litter on the forest floor. The new species differs from the two subspecies in that the posterior part of the abdomen is a darker colour, the line along the spine is dark and the eyelid processes are less-pointed. It is also distinguished genetically from them. There is a 2.2 to 2.8% variation in the 16S rRNA gene, the gene used for investigation, between it and the two subspecies whereas the subspecies are genetically more similar to each other (0.9 to 1.1%) than either of them is to the new species (A. channingi). A. s. chevalieri is the largest subspecies with adult males having an average snout-to-vent length of 127 mm (5.0 in) while A. s. superciliaris averages 121 mm (4.8 in). The new species is shorter again at 109 mm (4.3 in). Females are rather larger than males.

== Distribution and habitat ==
The African giant toad is native to tropical Central and West Africa. In the western part of its range it is rare and is found in primary forests alongside rivers, but further east it is found in both primary and secondary forests, in dense undergrowth and in cocoa plantations. Here it is more numerous but is still uncommon. Another view is that as this species is nocturnal and is so cryptically-coloured as to be difficult to discern, it may be much more common than is presently thought.

== Biology ==
Little is currently known about the biology of the African giant toad. Breeding probably takes place in the dry season, January to March. Clutches of eggs are laid in streams in areas of relatively calm water, the female probably depositing long strings of eggs wrapped around underwater vegetation. Juveniles have been seen in January in Nigeria, in March in Cameroon, and young toads less than 40 mm (1.6 in) long have been observed in February and the months between May and October in other parts of the range. Prey is likely to consist of invertebrates caught by the toad amongst the leaf-litter or in the water. This toad is known to consume ants and in captivity has eaten snails, insects, other frogs and tadpoles.

== Conservation status ==
The chief threat this toad faces is logging activities which degrade its habitat. This is particularly so in West Africa where it is restricted to primary forests. Elsewhere it seems more adaptable but is still susceptible to the loss of dense tree cover. It used to be collected for the pet trade and even though this is now illegal, it may sometimes still happen. The population trend is unknown, but because of its very wide range and presumed large total population, the IUCN has assessed it as being of "least concern".
