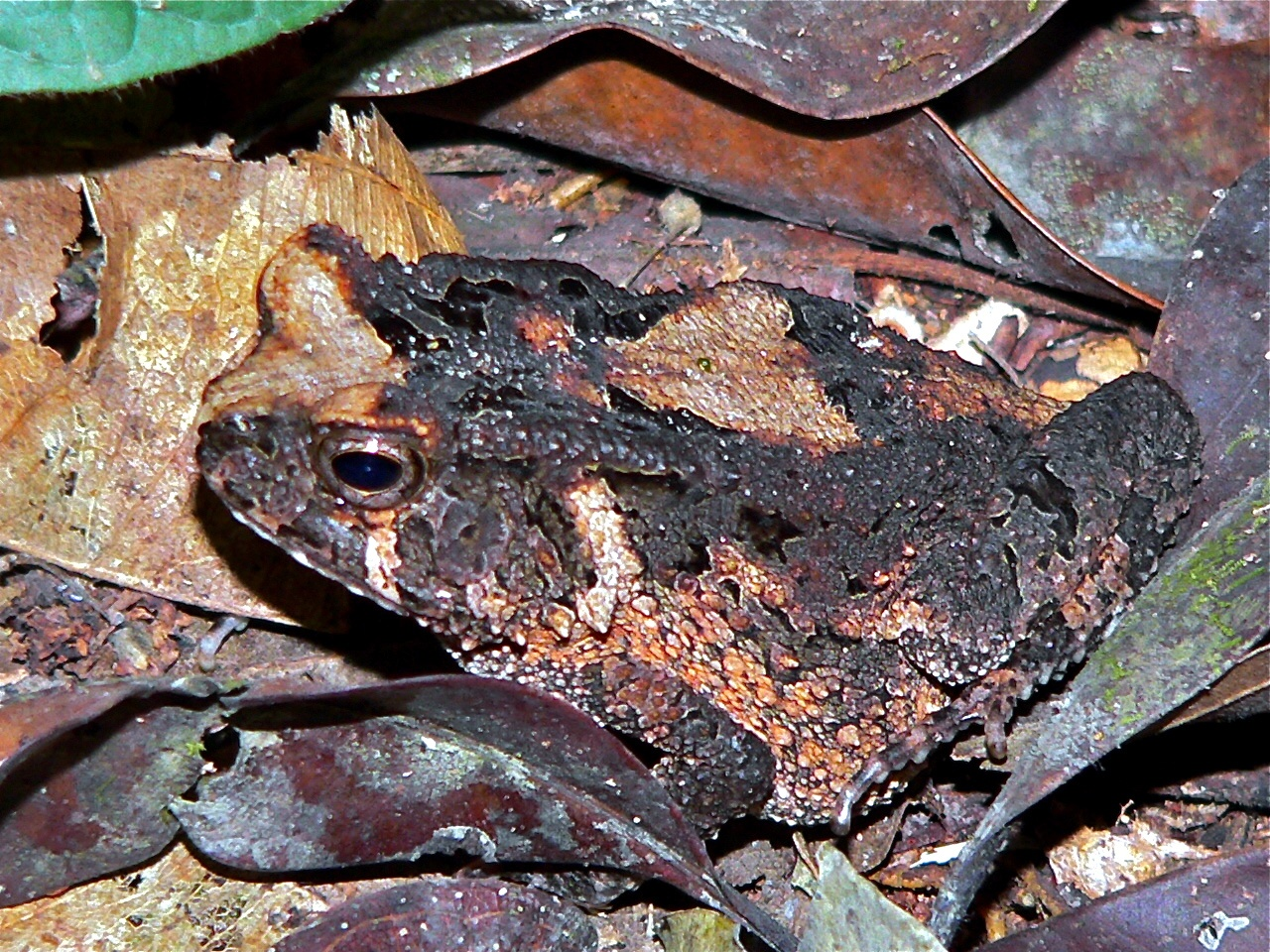

Conservation status
- Least Concern (IUCN 3.1)

Scientific classification
- Kingdom: Animalia
- Phylum: Chordata
- Class: Amphibia
- Order: Anura
- Family: Bufonidae
- Genus: Sclerophrys
- Species: S. camerunensis

Binomial name
- Sclerophrys camerunensis (Parker, 1936)

Synonyms
- Bufo camerunensis Parker, 1936; Amietophrynus camerunensis (Parker, 1936)

= Sclerophrys camerunensis =

Species of amphibian

Sclerophrys camerunensis is a species of toad in the family Bufonidae. It is found in southeastern Nigeria, southern Cameroon, Equatorial Guinea (including the island of Bioko), Gabon, the Central African Republic, and the Democratic Republic of the Congo. The record from southwestern Tanzania is uncertain. It is presumed to occur in the Republic of the Congo. Records from West Africa (other than southeastern Nigeria) probably refer to Sclerophrys togoensis. Common names Cameroon toad and Oban toad have been coined for this species.

Sclerophrys camerunensis occurs in forests, mostly below an elevation of 1,000 m (3,300 ft). It can also occur secondary brush. Breeding takes place in lakes, ponds, and very slow-flowing creeks in poorly drained forest. It is a very common species that is not threatened overall, although it probably can suffer locally from forest loss. It occurs in a number of protected areas.
