= Sclerophrys tihamica =

Conservation status
- Least Concern (IUCN 3.1)

Scientific classification
- Kingdom: Animalia
- Phylum: Chordata
- Class: Amphibia
- Order: Anura
- Family: Bufonidae
- Genus: Sclerophrys
- Species: S. tihamica

Binomial name
- Sclerophrys tihamica (Balletto and Cherchi, 1973)

Synonyms
- Bufo tihamicus Balletto and Cherchi, 1973; Amietophrynus tihamicus (Balletto and Cherchi, 1973)

Species of amphibian

Sclerophrys tihamica is a species of toad in the family Bufonidae. It is endemic to the Arabian Peninsula and occurs along the Red Sea coastline of Saudi Arabia and Yemen. It is sometimes known as Balletto's toad. Reports of Bufo pentoni (now Sclerophrys pentoni) from the Arabian Peninsula refer to this species.

Sclerophrys tihamica is a common and abundant species in wadis and irrigated areas. It occurs at elevations of 25–400 m (82–1,312 ft) above sea level. Breeding takes place in still or slow-moving water. There are no known threats to this species.
