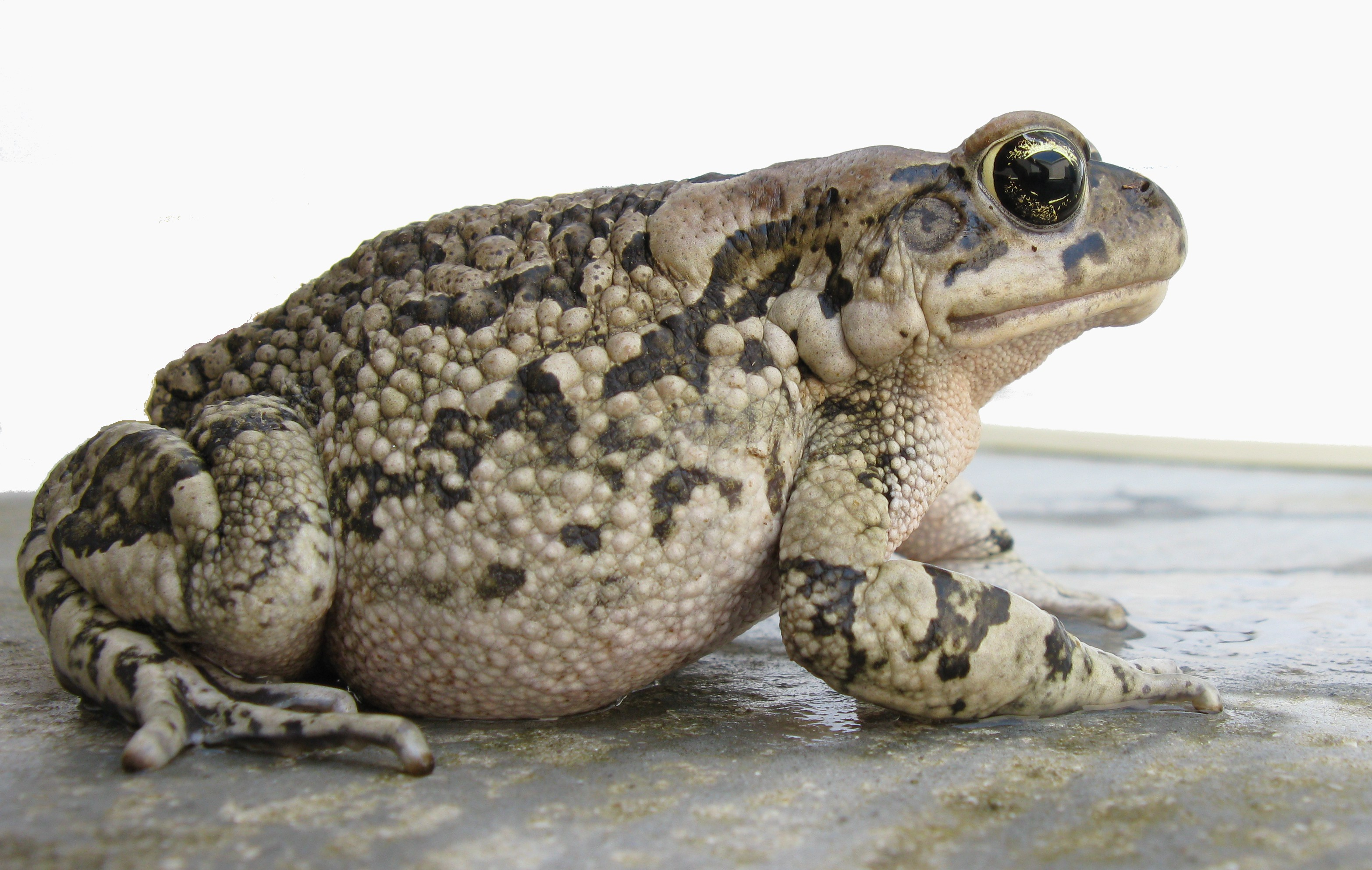

Conservation status
- Least Concern (IUCN 3.1)

Scientific classification
- Kingdom: Animalia
- Phylum: Chordata
- Class: Amphibia
- Order: Anura
- Family: Bufonidae
- Genus: Sclerophrys
- Species: S. capensis

Binomial name
- Sclerophrys capensis Tschudi, 1838

Synonyms
- Bufo regularis rangeri Hewitt, 1935; Bufo rangeri – Poynton, 1964; Amietophrynus rangeri – Frost et al., 2006

= Raucous toad =

Species of amphibian

The raucous toad (Sclerophrys capensis), also known as Ranger's toad, is a species of toad from Southern Africa.

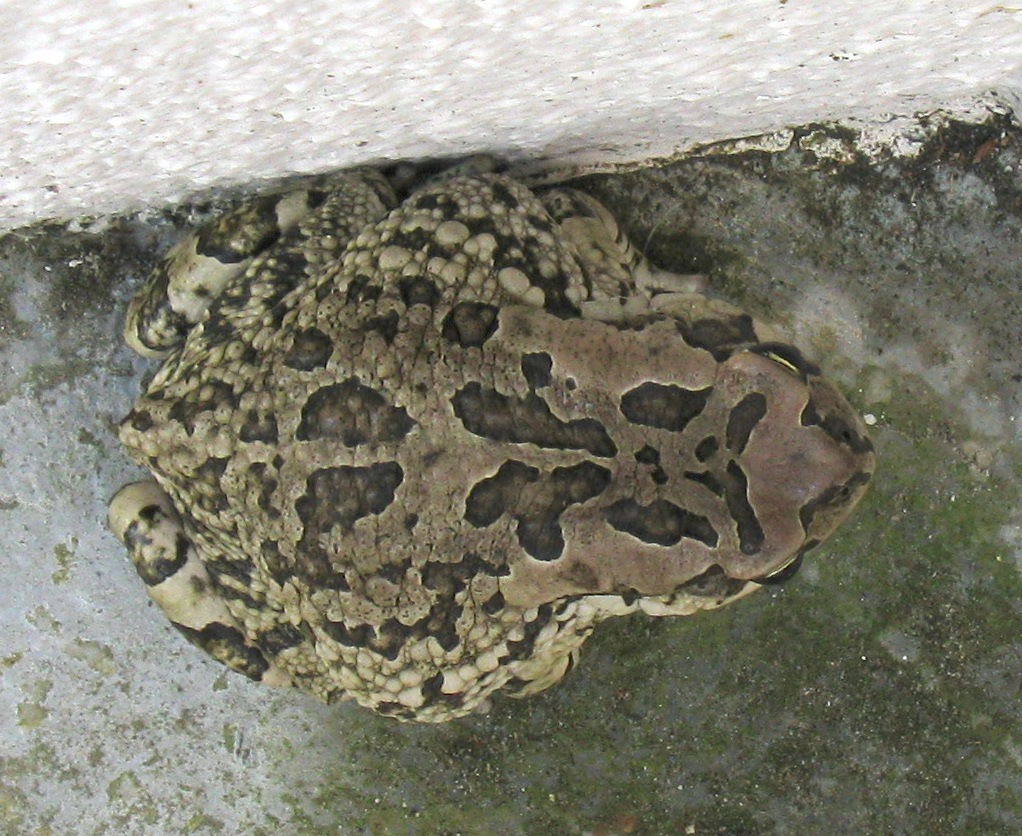
Dorsal aspect. Probable mature female.

== Taxonomy ==
Sclerophrys capensis is a member of the family Bufonidae. This species was described as Bufo regularis rangeri, in 1935, by John Hewitt of the Albany Museum, Grahamstown, from collections made by naturalist Gordon A. Ranger at his farm "Gleniffer" 3 km E of Kei Road, in the Eastern Cape province of South Africa. Among several other forms described from these collections was the eastern leopard toad, Sclerophrys pardalis, which Ranger distinguished from the raucous toad on behaviour and calls (according to his nephew, Mr Gary Ranger, "Gleniffer" was subdivided in the late 1930s and the portions renamed, including "Hillside" and "Rockdale", where there is a monument to the older Mr Ranger). Hewitt considered the raucous toad, along with most other large toads of Southern Africa, as subspecies of the widespread African toad Bufo regularis (a species which is now considered absent from Southern Africa, predominantly occurring in subsaharan Africa north of the equator). In 1964, Poynton raised Bufo rangeri of Hewitt, 1935 to full species status, distinguishing it from co-occurring related forms. More recently, Frost and co-authors (2006) assigned this species to the new genus Amietophrynus, as part of a global revision of amphibian taxonomy based largely on DNA sequence data.

Ohler and Dubois (2016) studied the type (and, previously, the only known) specimen of Sclerophrys capensis, collected in the Cape Province and described by Johann Jakob von Tschudi in 1838, and discovered that it belonged to the present species, then known as Amietophrynus rangeri. Accordingly, following the Principle of Priority of the ICZN Code, Sclerophrys replaces Amietophrynus, and S. capensis replaces A. rangeri, as the valid name for this genus and species, respectively.

== Description ==
Its maximal size, snout-to-vent, is about 120 mm. It is a characteristically robust medium-large-sized toad, dorsal and lateral skin liberally sprinkled with wart-like protuberances. Colour brown-to-greyish with more-or-less paired dark-brown patches flanking the medial dorsal line. The dark patches on the head meet in a brown chevron on top of the head behind and between the eyes. The anterior dorsal skin of the head lacks dark brown patches. Like most typical toads, it has a large parotoid gland behind each eye. If injured it will exude whitish spots of venom on the parotoid glands; this can be hazardous to domestic dogs if they bite a toad. The underside is whitish with the gular (throat) area of males infused with yellow with a dark blue-black bar posterior to the gular.

== Call ==
The advertisement call, made by males in the breeding season, is a loud repetitive duck-like quacking. Groups of calling males generally space themselves along the water's edge, or among plants in the water. Males in chorus call antiphonally (with calls from different individuals alternating).

== Habits ==
It is fairly aquatic as toads go, commonly inhabiting ponds and dams and streams, though it seems to prefer running water and accordingly favours fountains and similar water bodies. It typically is shy, but like many toads it will visit houses and other places where insect prey are attracted to lights, mainly outside the breeding season. It then establishes itself in moist, sheltered spots such as behind flowerpots and becomes tame if not molested. It will eat practically any small animal, including small vertebrates, but mainly insects up to the size of crickets.

== Range ==
S. capensis occurs in South Africa, Lesotho, Eswatini, extreme southern Namibia, and possibly extreme southern Botswana, Mozambique, and Zimbabwe.

== Habitat ==
S. capensis occurs in fynbos heathland, grassland, dry thicket forest, savanna, and agricultural land. Breeding takes place in dams, ponds, and pools along slow-forming streams. It shows some preference for permanent water bodies.
