= Sclerophrys urunguensis =

Conservation status
- Vulnerable (IUCN 3.1)

Scientific classification
- Kingdom: Animalia
- Phylum: Chordata
- Class: Amphibia
- Order: Anura
- Family: Bufonidae
- Genus: Sclerophrys
- Species: S. urunguensis

Binomial name
- Sclerophrys urunguensis (Loveridge, 1932)

Synonyms
- Bufo urunguensis Loveridge, 1932; Amietophrynus urunguensis (Loveridge, 1932)

Species of amphibian

Sclerophrys urunguensis is a species of toad in the family Bufonidae. It is found in the border area of Tanzania and Zambia, near the southeastern corner of Lake Tanganyika. One recent Tanzanian record is from close to the border with Burundi. Morphological characters suggests that it actually belongs to the genus Poyntonophrynus, but the formal move to that genus has not been made. Common name Urungu toad has been coined for it.

== Description ==
The type series consists of four specimens measuring 19–29 mm (0.7–1.1 in) in snout–vent length. The hootype is a 28-mm adult female; sex is not specified for the other types. The snout is short and truncated, and the canthus is very distinct. The tympanum is small, rounded, and quite distinct. The fingers are long. The toes may have some rudimentary webbing. Skin of the dorsum is very rough because of small warts with sharp spines. The dorsum is grey, tinged with brick-red and a trace of purple. There is a paler area between the eyes, extending backwards and branching to cover the parotoid glands. There are also several, irregular dark blotches, usually including a V-shaped one pointing to the anus. The underparts are creamy white speckled with purple.

== Habitat and conservation ==
The habitat requirements of this species are poorly known. The type series was collected in a remnant rainforest. More recent records are from woodlands. Assuming that it is reliant on forest habitat, it is expected to suffer from the ongoing decline in the quality and extent of such habitats in its distribution area. It is not known to occur in any protected areas.
