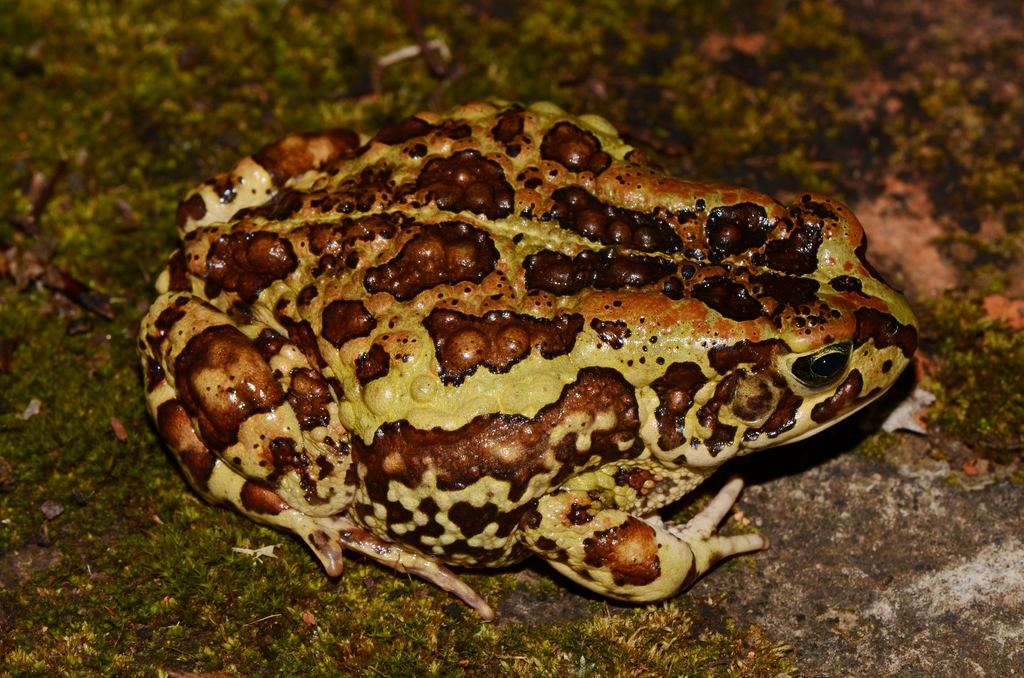

Conservation status
- Least Concern (IUCN 3.1)

Scientific classification
- Kingdom: Animalia
- Phylum: Chordata
- Class: Amphibia
- Order: Anura
- Family: Bufonidae
- Genus: Sclerophrys
- Species: S. kerinyagae

Binomial name
- Sclerophrys kerinyagae (Keith, 1968)

Synonyms
- Bufo kerinyagae Keith, 1968; Amietophrynus kerinyagae (Keith, 1968)

= Sclerophrys kerinyagae =

Species of amphibian

Sclerophrys kerinyagae is a species of toad in the family Bufonidae. It is found in central Ethiopia, Kenya, northern Tanzania, and eastern Uganda. Common names Keith's toad and Kerinyaga toad have been coined for it.

== Description ==
Adult males measure 60–85 mm (2.4–3.3 in) and adult females 63–86 mm (2.5–3.4 in) in snout–vent length. It is similar in overall appearance to Sclerophrys regularis. The snout is obtusely rounded. The tympanum is distinct and vertically oval. The parotoid glands are parallel and almost touching the eyes. The toes are about one-third webbed. The upper surfaces and the flanks are covered with conical warts that are tipped with sharp, brown, cornified spinules. The skin of the lower surface is coarsely granular. Males have a single, subgular vocal sac.

The male advertisement call is more rapidly pulsed (38–48 pulses per second) than in Sclerophrys regularis (13–18 pulses per second).

== Habitat and conservation ==
Sclerophrys kerinyagae occurs in montane grasslands and forest edges at elevations of 1,280–3,300 m (4,200–10,830 ft) above sea level. Breeding takes place in permanent pools, rain-fed temporary pools, and flooded fields in montane grassland. It is a common species that is not threatened overall, although it suffers from habitat degradation resulting from human expansion and settlement as well from overgrazing by livestock. It occurs in a number of protected areas.
