= Arabicus =

Arabicus may refer to:

- Arabicus, a Roman imperial victory title
- Bufo arabicus, synonym for Sclerophrys arabica, the Arabian toad
