= Leopard toad =

Leopard toad may refer to:

- Eastern leopard toad (Amietophrynus pardalis), a toad in the family Bufonidae endemic to South Africa
- Western leopard toad (Amietophrynus pantherinus), a toad in the family Bufonidae endemic to the low-lying areas of the Cape Peninsula, the Cape Flats and the Agulhas flats of the Western Cape, South Africa
