= Poyntonophrynus hoeschi =

Conservation status
- Least Concern (IUCN 3.1)

Scientific classification
- Kingdom: Animalia
- Phylum: Chordata
- Class: Amphibia
- Order: Anura
- Family: Bufonidae
- Genus: Poyntonophrynus
- Species: P. hoeschi

Binomial name
- Poyntonophrynus hoeschi (Ahl, 1934)

Synonyms
- Bufo hoeschi Ahl, 1934; Bufo jordani Parker, 1936

Species of amphibian

Poyntonophrynus hoeschi is a species of toad in the family Bufonidae. It is endemic to western and central Namibia. The specific name hoeschi honours Walter Hoesch, a German zoologist. Common names Hoesch's toad, Hoesch's pygmy toad, and Okahandja toad have been proposed for it.

== Description ==
Males grow to 32 mm (1.3 in) and females to 37 mm (1.5 in) in snout–vent length. The tympanum may not be visible. The parotoid glands are flattened. The finger and toe tips are rounded; some webbing is present between the toes. The dorsum is warty. Dorsal colouration is brown with a paler neck patch and paired darker margins. Some individuals have a pale vertebral stripe and/or orange warts. The belly is pale and has no markings.

The male advertisement call is a very brief chirp.

== Habitat and conservation ==
Poyntonophrynus hoeschi inhabits very dry semi-desert areas near rock outcrops. Breeding takes places in temporary rock pools where males call after heavy rains. It a reasonably common species in suitable habitats. There are no significant threats to it, apart from possible effects of overgrazing. It is present in the Namibia Desert National Park and—probably—in some other protected areas too.
