= Nile Delta toad =

Conservation status
- Least Concern (IUCN 3.1)

Scientific classification
- Kingdom: Animalia
- Phylum: Chordata
- Class: Amphibia
- Order: Anura
- Family: Bufonidae
- Genus: Amietophrynus
- Species: A. kassasii

Binomial name
- Amietophrynus kassasii (Baha El Din, 1993)

Synonyms
- Bufo kassassii Baha El Din, 1993; Sclerophrys kassasii (Baha El Din, 1993)

Species of amphibian

The Nile Delta toad or Damietta toad (Amietophrynus kassasii) is a species of toad in the family Bufonidae. It is endemic to Egypt, where it is found from the Nile Delta to as far south as Luxor. Its natural habitats are swamps, freshwater marshes, arable land, urban areas, seasonally flooded agricultural land and canals and ditches.

== Taxonomy ==
Between 1909 and 1912, several specimens of a small toad species were collected near Alexandria and were sent to the British Museum, where they were identified as Bufo vittatus (now Amietophrynus vittatus). No further specimens were found. In 1991, a new species of toad was discovered by Baha el Din near Damietta in the Nile Delta which differed in several particulars from B. vittatus, which is otherwise only known from the vicinity of Lake Victoria, and the original identification was called into question. The new species was described in 1993 as Bufo kassassii, and has since been transferred to the genus Amietophrynus becoming Amietophrynus kassasii.

== Description ==
The Nile Delta toad is a small species, with females growing to a snout-to-vent length of 38 mm (1.5 in) and males to 34 mm (1.3 in). The upper surface is a greenish-grey colour with dark blotches between the eyes, on the shoulders and hips, and usually a thin white stripe along the spine. The underparts are white, sometimes with dark specks, and the hips can have dark red patches. It has a long snout which is slender when viewed from the side, large distinct tympani (eardrums) and indistinct oval paratoid glands. The skin of the back is somewhat granular or may bear spiny warts, and that on the underside is slightly granular. The first finger of the hand is shorter than the second, most individuals have a red patch on the thigh, and males in breeding condition have an orange vocal sac. These and certain other characteristics distinguish this species from A. vittatus and from all other toads found in Egypt.

== Distribution and habitat ==
The Nile Delta toad was originally found in the Nile Delta in Egypt. It is a small, nocturnal aquatic species and is seldom seen, although its presence in an area may be known from the distinctive call made by the male. It occurs in swamps, rice fields and clumps of floating vegetation and has spread further upstream as reeds have become established along the margins of the River Nile and the canals associated with it. It is now present in Cairo and as far south as Luxor, where it is said to be abundant.

== Status ==
The Nile Delta toad has a total range of less than 20,000 square kilometres (7,700 sq mi), and although it is familiar in dense populations, it is rarely seen. But it has adapted to inhabit rice fields and cultivated land as well as its natural swampy habitat. It is present in several protected areas and faces no particular threats, so the IUCN has listed it as being of "least concern".
