= Sclerophrys reesi =

Conservation status
- Data Deficient (IUCN 3.1)

Scientific classification
- Kingdom: Animalia
- Phylum: Chordata
- Class: Amphibia
- Order: Anura
- Family: Bufonidae
- Genus: Sclerophrys
- Species: S. reesi

Binomial name
- Sclerophrys reesi (Poynton, 1977)

Synonyms
- Bufo reesi Poynton, 1977; Amietophrynus reesi (Poynton, 1977)

Species of amphibian

Sclerophrys reesi, also known as Merara toad or Rees' toad, is a species of toad in the family Bufonidae. It is endemic to southern Tanzania and is only known from the Kihansi–Ulanga River floodplain from elevations of 200–500 m (660–1,640 ft) above sea level. It is named after Allen Rees, a principal game warden for the Tanzanian Wildlife Department who collected the type series.

== Description ==
The holotype, an adult male, measures 57 mm (2.2 in) in snout–urostyle length. Three adult female paratypes measure 55–60 mm (2.2–2.4 in) in snout–urostyle length. The snout is acuminate. The tympanum is very distinct and almost circular. The parotoid glands are flattened and not very distinct. The toes are extensively webbed. Skin is granular. Alcohol-preserved specimens are light brown with darker inter-ocular, scapular, and sacral markings and golden brown warts and parotoid glands.

== Habitat and conservation ==
The type series from was collected from a flood plain. Presumably the habitat of this species is floodplain grassland and the tadpoles are aquatic.

Threats to Sclerophrys reesi are poorly known, but agricultural encroachment, overgrazing by livestock, and expanding human settlements are potential threats. It is present in the poorly protected Kilombero Game Controlled Area.
