= Sclerophrys langanoensis =

Conservation status
- Data Deficient (IUCN 3.1)

Scientific classification
- Kingdom: Animalia
- Phylum: Chordata
- Class: Amphibia
- Order: Anura
- Family: Bufonidae
- Genus: Sclerophrys
- Species: S. langanoensis

Binomial name
- Sclerophrys langanoensis (Largen, Tandy, and Tandy, 1978)

Synonyms
- Bufo langanoensis Largen, Tandy, and Tandy, 1978); Amietophrynus langanoensis (Largen, Tandy, and Tandy, 1978)

Species of amphibian

Sclerophrys langanoensis is a species of toad in the family Bufonidae. It is endemic to northern Rift Valley in Ethiopia, where it has been recorded from Lake Langano (its type locality) and the Awash National Park; the latter population might represent a distinct species. It is likely that this species will also be found in Eritrea and Somalia. Common name Lake Langano toad has been coined for it.

== Description ==
Adult males measure 41–60 mm (1.6–2.4 in) and adult females 59–63 mm (2.3–2.5 in) in snout–urostyle length. The head is triangular with a rounded snout. The tympanum is distinct. The parotoid glands are moderately well defined. The toes have extensive webbing. The dorsum has many rounded warts and distinct, small warts forming two rows along the mid-line. Dorsal ground colour varies from pale greenish-grey to sepia. A narrow but often indistinct vertebral line is frequently present. A pattern of brown or orange blotches may be present.

== Habitat and conservation ==
Sclerophrys langanoensis occurs in and near permanent water (stream-fed pools, irrigation ditches, and non-alkaline lakes) in arid savanna and semi-desert areas at elevations of 700–1,585 m (2,297–5,200 ft) above sea level. The tadpoles develop in permanent lakes and pools.

This species has been reasonably common at the two localities where it is known, but recent data are lacking. It is threatened by environmental degradation and water pollution. However, irrigation schemes that increase the availability of suitable habitat could benefit it. S. langanoensis occurs in one protected area, the Awash National Park.
