= Sclerophrys pusilla =

Conservation status
- Least Concern (IUCN 3.1)

Scientific classification
- Kingdom: Animalia
- Phylum: Chordata
- Class: Amphibia
- Order: Anura
- Family: Bufonidae
- Genus: Sclerophrys
- Species: S. pusilla

Binomial name
- Sclerophrys pusilla (Mertens, 1937)

Synonyms
- Bufo regularis pusillus Mertens, 1937; Bufo pusillus – Pienaar, 1963; Bufo latifrons savannae – Inger, 1968; Bufo maculatus pusillus – Hulselmans, 1970; Sclerophrys pusilla (Mertens, 1937)

Species of amphibian

Sclerophrys pusilla is a species of toad in the family Bufonidae. It is found in Angola, northern Namibia, Botswana, northeastern South Africa, Zimbabwe, Mozambique, Zambia, Tanzania, southern Kenya, Uganda, eastern Ethiopia, parts of South Sudan, Gabon and Cameroon, as well as the Central African Republic. The specific name pusilla means "small" in Latin, and refers to the fact that this frog is smaller than others in the Sclerophrys genus.

Sclerophrys pusilla inhabits savanna and lowveld grassland, and likes shallow, slow-moving or stationary water.
