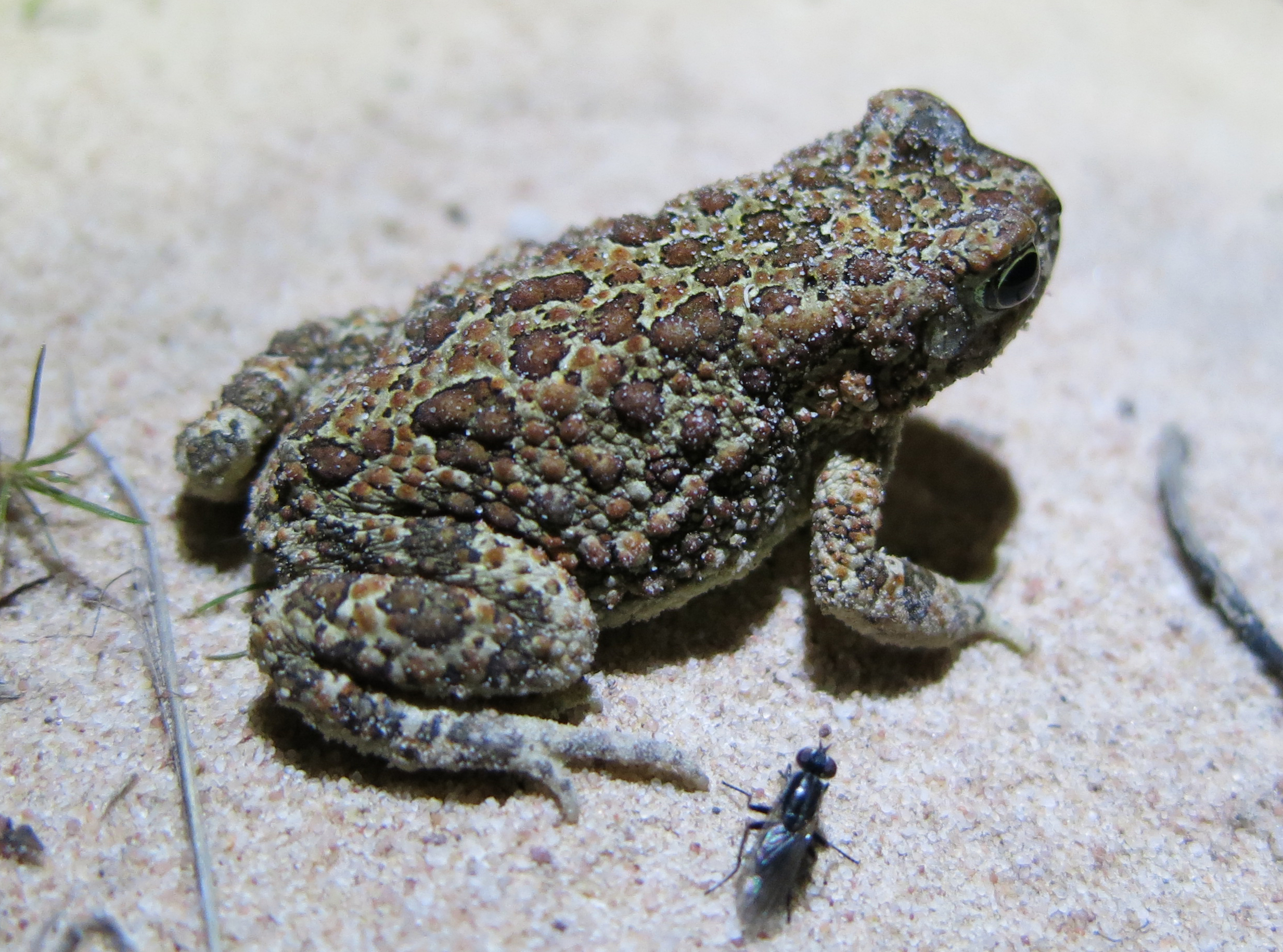
- Poyntonophrynus fenoulheti, Limpopo, South Africa.

Conservation status
- Least Concern (IUCN 3.1)

Scientific classification
- Kingdom: Animalia
- Phylum: Chordata
- Class: Amphibia
- Order: Anura
- Family: Bufonidae
- Genus: Poyntonophrynus
- Species: P. fenoulheti

Binomial name
- Poyntonophrynus fenoulheti (Hewitt and Methuen, 1912)

Synonyms
- Bufo fenoulheti Hewitt and Methuen, 1912

= Poyntonophrynus fenoulheti =

Species of amphibian

Poyntonophrynus fenoulheti is a species of small toad found in southern Africa (Botswana, Eswatini, Mozambique, Namibia, South Africa, Zambia, Zimbabwe). It is known under many common names, including Fenoulhet's toad, Fenoulhet's pygmy toad, and northern pygmy toad. It grows to a maximum size of 43 mm.

These frogs are associated with rocky areas and are found in Bushveld vegetation.
