= Sclerophrys dodsoni =

Conservation status
- Least Concern (IUCN 3.1)

Scientific classification
- Kingdom: Animalia
- Phylum: Chordata
- Class: Amphibia
- Order: Anura
- Family: Bufonidae
- Genus: Sclerophrys
- Species: S. dodsoni

Binomial name
- Sclerophrys dodsoni (Boulenger, 1895)

Synonyms
- Bufo dodsoni Boulenger, 1895

Species of amphibian

Sclerophrys dodsoni, commonly known as Dodson's toad, is a species of toad in the family Bufonidae. It is found in Djibouti, Egypt, Eritrea, Ethiopia, Somalia, and Sudan. Its natural habitats are dry savanna, subtropical or tropical dry shrubland, freshwater marshes, intermittent freshwater marshes, inland karsts, caves, and hot deserts. It is threatened by habitat loss.
