= Sclerophrys tuberosa =

Conservation status
- Least Concern (IUCN 3.1)

Scientific classification
- Kingdom: Animalia
- Phylum: Chordata
- Class: Amphibia
- Order: Anura
- Family: Bufonidae
- Genus: Sclerophrys
- Species: S. tuberosa

Binomial name
- Sclerophrys tuberosa (Günther, 1858)

Synonyms
- Bufo tuberosus Günther, 1858; Bufo polycerus Werner, 1897; Amietophrynus tuberosus (Günther, 1858)

Species of amphibian

Sclerophrys tuberosa is a species of toad in the family Bufonidae. It is found in southeastern Nigeria, Cameroon, southwestern Central African Republic, Equatorial Guinea (including Bioko), Gabon, and northern Democratic Republic of the Congo and Republic of the Congo. Common names rough toad, warty toad, and Fernando Po toad have been proposed for it.

== Description ==
Males grow to 48 mm (1.9 in) and females to 74 mm (2.9 in) in snout–vent length. The body is compact and the snout is short. The eyes are relatively large. The parotoid glands are very large. Dorsal skin is densely covered by long, spiny warts, while ventrally skin is granular. The toes have rudimentary webbing. Dorsal coloration is light to dark brown with irregular black spots; a light vertebral line is sometimes present. The limbs have black crossbars. The venter is yellow with darker spots or mottling.

The male advertisement call is a quiet, low-pitched "rrrou" or "rroua".

== Habitat and conservation ==
Sclerophrys tuberosa inhabits moist lowland tropical rainforest in swampy areas, avoiding well-drained forest. It is a lowland species but can occur at elevations up to 1,050 m (3,440 ft) or 1,300 m (4,300 ft) above sea level. Breeding takes place in small streams; the males call from cavities near water.

Sclerophrys tuberosa is very common in parts of its range (e.g., Cameroon) but rarer in other areas. It tolerates some habitat modification and can be found in secondary forest, but cannot survive outside forest and is thereby negatively impacted by forest loss. However, it occurs in several protected areas.
