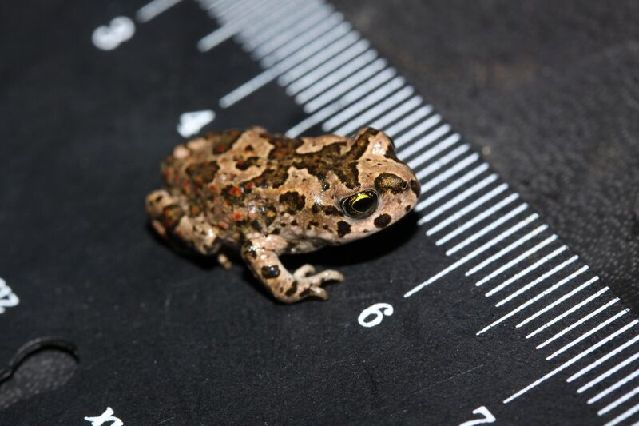

Conservation status
- Least Concern (IUCN 3.1)

Scientific classification
- Kingdom: Animalia
- Phylum: Chordata
- Class: Amphibia
- Order: Anura
- Family: Bufonidae
- Genus: Poyntonophrynus
- Species: P. vertebralis

Binomial name
- Poyntonophrynus vertebralis (Smith, 1842)

Synonyms
- Bufo vertebralis Smith, 1848

= Poyntonophrynus vertebralis =

Species of amphibian

Poyntonophrynus vertebralis is a species of toad in the family Bufonidae. It is found in South Africa, Lesotho, and possibly Botswana and southeastern Zimbabwe. It has many common names: pigmy toad, pygmy toad, flat toad, African dwarf toad, and southern pygmy toad.

Its natural habitats are Nama karroo shrubland, grassland, dry savanna, and pastureland. It is a locally common species that breeds in various small waterbodies (temporary shallow pans, pools or depressions containing rainwater, quarries, and rock pools along rivers). It is locally threatened by habitat loss.
