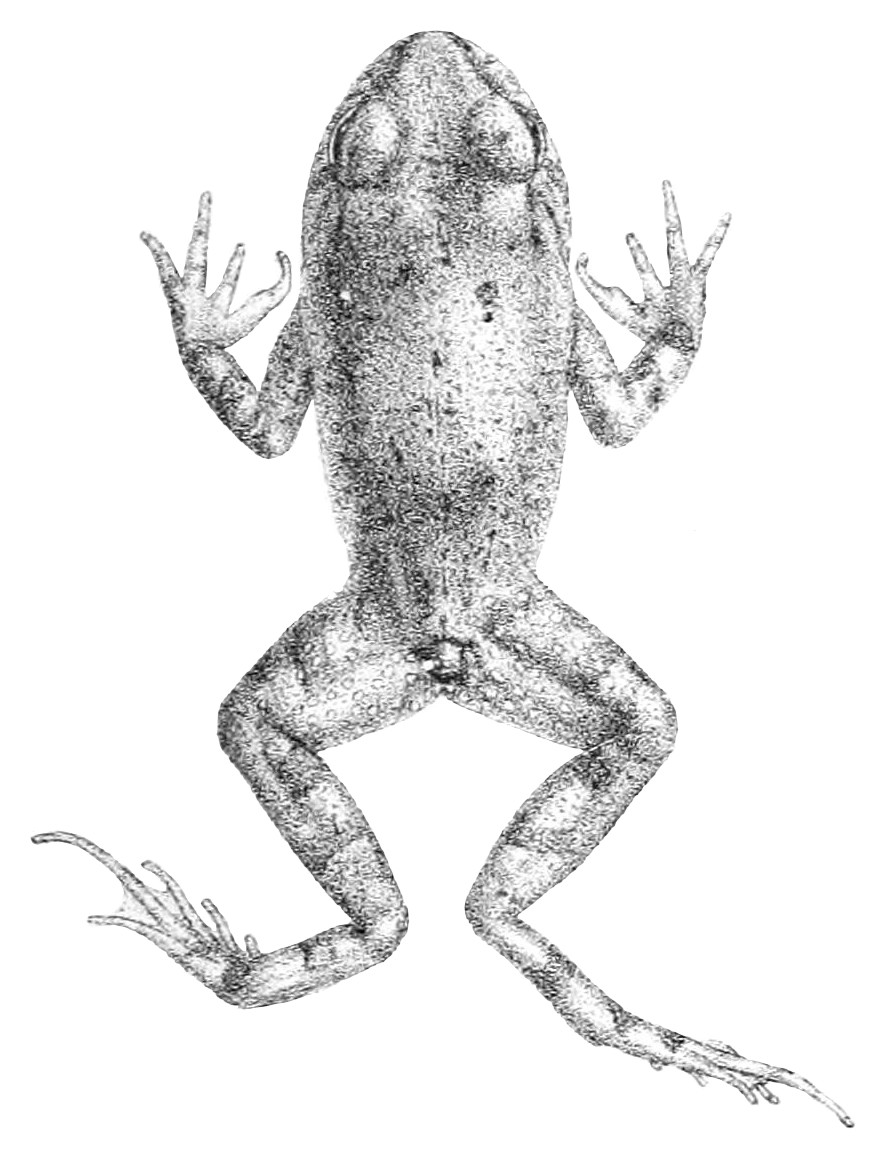

Conservation status
- Least Concern (IUCN 3.1)

Scientific classification
- Kingdom: Animalia
- Phylum: Chordata
- Class: Amphibia
- Order: Anura
- Family: Bufonidae
- Genus: Sclerophrys
- Species: S. blanfordii

Binomial name
- Sclerophrys blanfordii (Boulenger, 1882)

Synonyms
- Bufo blandfordii Boulenger, 1882; Amietophrynus blanfordii (Boulenger, 1882); Bufo viridis somalacus Meek, 1897; Bufo somalicus Calabresi, 1927; Bufo sibiliai Scortecci, 1929

= Sclerophrys blanfordii =

Species of amphibian

Sclerophrys blanfordii is a species of toad in the family Bufonidae. It is found in northeastern Ethiopia, Somaliland, Djibouti, and Eritrea. The specific name blanfordii honours William Thomas Blandford, a British geologist and zoologist. Common names Blanford's toad and Ethiopia toad have been coined for it, the latter might specifically refer to the now-synonymized Bufo sibiliai.

Sclerophrys blanfordii is associated with permanent water in arid rocky habitats; it seems never wander far from the shallow pools in which it breeds. It might be locally common but the distribution is scattered and populations are isolated; this likely reflects the availability of suitable habitat. It is likely threatened by habitat loss caused by increasing pressure on its breeding pools. It is not known from any protected areas.
