= Poyntonophrynus damaranus =

Conservation status
- Data Deficient (IUCN 3.1)

Scientific classification
- Kingdom: Animalia
- Phylum: Chordata
- Class: Amphibia
- Order: Anura
- Family: Bufonidae
- Genus: Poyntonophrynus
- Species: P. damaranus

Binomial name
- Poyntonophrynus damaranus (Mertens, 1954)

Synonyms
- Bufo fenoulheti damaranus Mertens, 1954; Bufo damaranus Mertens, 1954

Species of amphibian

Poyntonophrynus damaranus is a species of toad in the family Bufonidae. This species was previously known as Bufo damaranus, which is now considered a synonym. This anuran is endemic to Kaokoveld-Waterberg in area of northern and northwestern Namibia. The validity of this species has been questioned.

== Habitat ==
The ecology of this species unknown, but it is assumed to live in semi-arid habitats and breed in temporary waterbodies.
