= Beira toad =

Conservation status
- Least Concern (IUCN 3.1)

Scientific classification
- Kingdom: Animalia
- Phylum: Chordata
- Class: Amphibia
- Order: Anura
- Family: Bufonidae
- Genus: Poyntonophrynus
- Species: P. beiranus

Binomial name
- Poyntonophrynus beiranus (Loveridge, 1932)

Synonyms
- Bufo taitanus beiranus Loveridge, 1932; Bufo beiranus Loveridge, 1932

Species of amphibian

The Beira toad (Poyntonophrynus beiranus), or Beira pygmy toad, is a species of toad in the family Bufonidae from southern Africa.

== Description ==
The Beira toad lacks prominent parotoid glands and these do not form a continuous platform with the top of the head. it also lacks any dorsal hourglass patternation, and any conspicuous tarsal fold. It has finely spotted ventral skin The feet are not adapted for burrowing and do not have adhesive terminal discs on either the fingers or toes. They do not have hard claws and eye pupils are never vertical.

== Distribution ==
It is found in two apparently separate areas: the coastal plain of central Mozambique in the flood plain of the Pungwe River north to Thuchila in southern Malawi, and floodplains in the Zambezi catchment area in central and southwestern Zambia. Its type locality is Beira, Mozambique, hence the name.

== Habitat ==
The Beira toad's natural habitats consist of subtropical or tropical seasonally wet or flooded lowland grasslands; intermittent freshwater marshes within or around sub-tropical or tropical shrubland. It occurs up to at least 1000 m above sea level.

== Habits ==
Beira toads are thought to breed in ephemeral pools formed after intermittent heavy rains. The males advertisement call is a high-frequency buzz which resembles some insect noises.

== Conservation ==
The chief threats to the Beira toad are over-extraction of surface waters, and from conversion of certain lands to agriculture It probably is found within several protected areas, notably the Kafue National Park and South Luangwa National Park of Zambia. Its true range is probably underestimated as this is a difficult species to record.
