= Adamawa Plateau =

Plateau region in west-central Africa

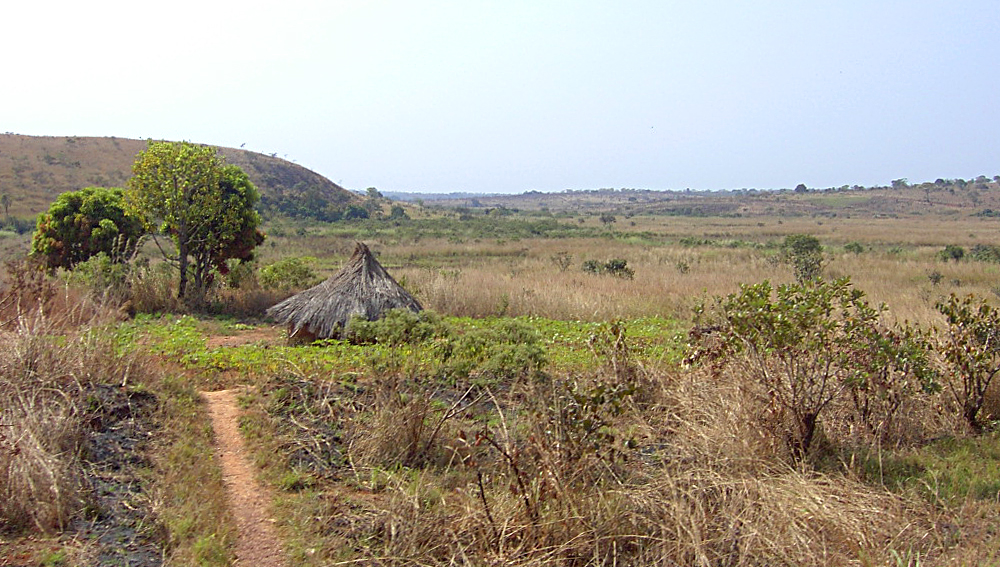
- Landscape near Ngaoundal in Cameroon's Adamawa Province

Highest point
- Elevation: 2,650 m (8,690 ft)
- Coordinates: 9°48′N 14°05′E

Geography
- Countries: Cameroon, Central African Republic and Nigeria

The Adamawa Plateau (French: Massif de l'Adamaoua) is a plateau region in west-central Africa stretching from south-eastern Nigeria through north-central Cameroon (Adamawa and North Provinces) to the Central African Republic. The part of the plateau that lies in Nigeria is more popularly known as Gotel Mountains.

The Adamawa Plateau is the source of many waterways, including the Benue River. The average elevation is about 1,000 metres (3,300 feet), but elevations can reach as high as 2,700 metres (8,700 feet). It is important for its deposits of bauxite. The vegetation is mostly savanna. The endangered toad Amietophrynus djohongensis is known to exist in the wild only in the Cameroonian part of the Adamawa Plateau.

The plateau is sparsely populated, and cattle raising is the main occupation in the area. The province and plateau were named after Fulani Muslim leader Modibo Adama, whose jihad significantly affected the population of the area.
