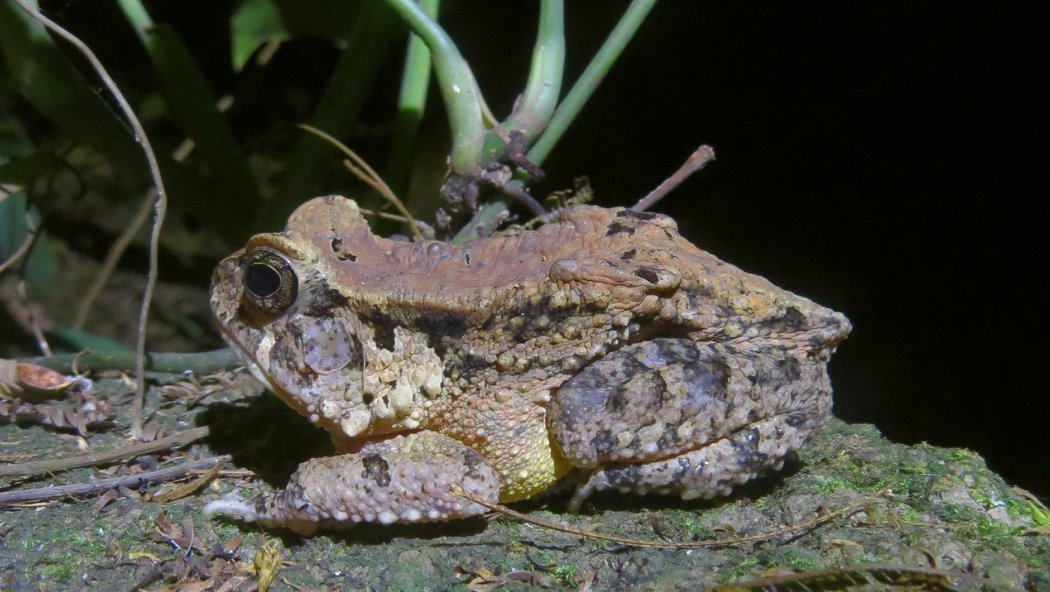

Conservation status
- Least Concern (IUCN 3.1)

Scientific classification
- Kingdom: Animalia
- Phylum: Chordata
- Class: Amphibia
- Order: Anura
- Family: Bufonidae
- Genus: Sclerophrys
- Species: S. togoensis

Binomial name
- Sclerophrys togoensis Ahl, 1924

Synonyms
- Bufo togoensis Ahl, 1924; Bufo cristiglans Inger and Menzies, 1961; Amietophrynus cristiglans (Inger and Menzies, 1961); Amietophrynus togoensis (Ahl, 1924) Frost et al., 2006; Sclerophrys cristiglans (Inger and Menzies, 1961) Ohler and Dubois, 2016

= Sclerophrys togoensis =

Species of amphibian

Sclerophrys togoensis, known commonly as the Tingi Hills toad or Togo toad, is a species of toad in the family Bufonidae. It is found in West Africa from Sierra Leone to Togo. Its natural habitats are rivers, subtropical or tropical moist lowland forests and high forest at moderate elevations. It is threatened by habitat loss.

== Description ==
Sclerophrys togoensis is a moderate-sized species with adult males measuring about 60 mm (2.4 in) from snout to vent. They have a distinct tympanum; a tarsal ridge; low, rounded warts on back and sides; elongate parotoids that reach the eye with a distinct dorsolateral edge; and a first finger longer than the second. The color of these frogs in life is clay above but darker on the sides with two indefinite transverse light areas, one interorbital and one sacral. There is a dark bar on the cheek below the eye and another from the eye to the rictus covering the tympanum as well as an interrupted interorbital dark bar and obscure dark markings on the back. The limbs have dark cross-bars dorsally and the rear of the thigh has 5-7 narrow vertical dark bars. The throat has a light dusting of melanophores and the vocal sac is black and visible through the gular skin. The whole ventral surface is yellow deepening to orange laterally and to crimson on the thighs. Once preserved in alcohol, the ventral surfaces are cream colored and unmarked.
