= Sclerophrys brauni =

Conservation status
- Least Concern (IUCN 3.1)

Scientific classification
- Kingdom: Animalia
- Phylum: Chordata
- Class: Amphibia
- Order: Anura
- Family: Bufonidae
- Genus: Sclerophrys
- Species: S. brauni

Binomial name
- Sclerophrys brauni (Nieden, 1911)

Synonyms
- Bufo brauni Nieden, 1911; Amietophrynus brauni (Nieden, 1911)

Species of amphibian

Sclerophrys brauni is a species of toad in the family Bufonidae.

It is endemic to Tanzania. Its natural habitats are subtropical or tropical moist lowland forests, subtropical or tropical moist montane forests, subtropical or tropical dry shrubland, rivers, and heavily degraded former forest. It is threatened by habitat loss.
