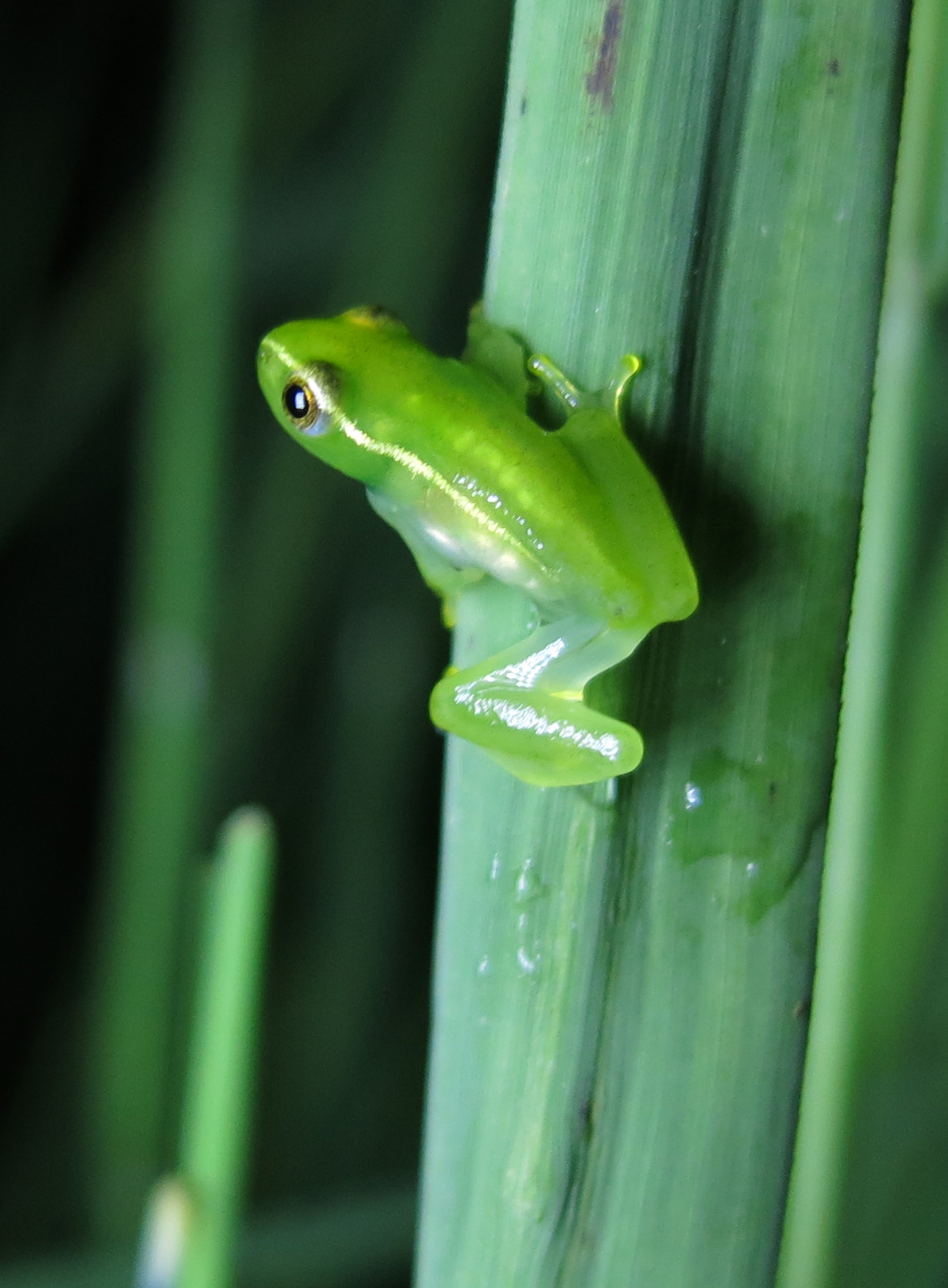
- Hyperolius poweri was previously included in Hyperolius acuticeps. Based on the locality (Durban), this frog identified as H. acuticeps is H. poweri.

Conservation status
- Least Concern (IUCN 3.1)

Scientific classification
- Kingdom: Animalia
- Phylum: Chordata
- Class: Amphibia
- Order: Anura
- Family: Hyperoliidae
- Genus: Hyperolius
- Species: H. poweri

Binomial name
- Hyperolius poweri Loveridge, 1938

= Hyperolius poweri =

Species of amphibian

Hyperolius poweri is a species of frogs in the family Hyperoliidae. It is found in southeastern coast of South Africa and southern Mozambique. The specific name poweri honours John Hyacinth Power, Irish-born director of the McGregor Museum (Kimberley, South Africa) who collected amphibians as well as reptiles and plants. Accordingly, common names Power's reed frog and Power's long reed frog have been proposed for this species.

== Taxonomy ==
Hyperolius poweri was described by Arthur Loveridge in 1938 based on material from near Stanger in KwaZulu-Natal, South Africa. It belongs to the taxonomically difficult Hyperolius nasutus group. For a period, Hyperolius poweri was considered synonym of Hyperolius acuticeps, but is now recognized as a distinct species. On the other hand, Hyperolius acuticeps itself is now considered synonym of Hyperolius microps.

== Description ==
Males grow to 20 mm (0.8 in) and females to 25 mm (1.0 in) in snout–vent length. The snout is bluntly rounded in lateral view and sharply rounded from above. The toes are extensively webbed. The fingers and toes bear yellowish-green discs that are larger in the former. The dorsum is green with white lateral bands that run from over the eyes to the vent (sometimes these bands are not visible). There is a dark line running from the tip of the snout to the eyes. Males have white throat.

== Habitat and conservation ==
Hyperolius poweri occurs in association with emergent vegetation at the margins of swamps, rivers and lakes in savanna and grassland habitats. Males call from sedges and other emergent vegetation.

Although threatened by habitat loss and degradation, Hyperolius poweri has a relatively wide distribution and plenty of suitable habitat remaining, and it has been assessed as of "least concern" (2016). It is present in many protected areas. Nevertheless, the overall population appears to have declined.
