= Poyntonophrynus lughensis =

Conservation status
- Least Concern (IUCN 3.1)

Scientific classification
- Kingdom: Animalia
- Phylum: Chordata
- Class: Amphibia
- Order: Anura
- Family: Bufonidae
- Genus: Poyntonophrynus
- Species: P. lughensis

Binomial name
- Poyntonophrynus lughensis (Loveridge, 1932)

Synonyms
- Bufo lughensis Loveridge, 1932; Bufo gardoensis Scortecci, 1932; Bufo chappuisi Roux, 1936

Species of amphibian

Poyntonophrynus lughensis, also known as the lugh toad or the lugh pygmy toad, is a species of toad in the family Bufonidae. It is found in Somalia, northern and eastern Kenya, eastern, central and southern Ethiopia, and extreme southeastern South Sudan. Its natural habitat is very dry savanna. It breeds after the beginning of the rains in temporarily flooded hollows, including roadside ditches. The main threat to this species environmental degradation caused by human expansion and settlement, with increased populations of livestock as a consequence.
