= Sclerophrys turkanae =

Conservation status
- Data Deficient (IUCN 3.1)

Scientific classification
- Kingdom: Animalia
- Phylum: Chordata
- Class: Amphibia
- Order: Anura
- Family: Bufonidae
- Genus: Sclerophrys
- Species: S. turkanae

Binomial name
- Sclerophrys turkanae (Tandy and Feener, 1985)

Synonyms
- Bufo turkanae Tandy and Feener, 1985; Amietophrynus turkanae (Tandy and Feener, 1985)

Species of amphibian

Sclerophrys turkanae, the Lake Turkana toad or Turkana toad, is a species of toad in the family Bufonidae. It is endemic to Kenya, and is only known from two localities; Loiyangalani on the southeastern shores of Lake Turkana, and the Ewaso Ng'iro River in the Samburu National Reserve.

It is known from arid semi-desert regions with nearby permanent water (either lake or river). Breeding and larval development presumably takes place in water. Threats to this poorly known species are unknown.
