= Poyntonophrynus dombensis =

Conservation status
- Least Concern (IUCN 3.1)

Scientific classification
- Kingdom: Animalia
- Phylum: Chordata
- Class: Amphibia
- Order: Anura
- Family: Bufonidae
- Genus: Poyntonophrynus
- Species: P. dombensis

Binomial name
- Poyntonophrynus dombensis (Bocage, 1895)

Synonyms
- Bufo dombensis Bocage, 1895

Species of amphibian

Poyntonophrynus dombensis (common name: Dombe toad or Dombe pygmy toad) is a species of toad in the family Bufonidae. It is found in southwestern Angola and northwestern Namibia.

Poyntonophrynus dombensis live in arid grassland areas with rock outcrops. It breeds in small, temporary streams and (presumably) pools. It is very common in suitable habitat and is facing no threats.
