= Sclerophrys vittata =

Conservation status
- Data Deficient (IUCN 3.1)

Scientific classification
- Kingdom: Animalia
- Phylum: Chordata
- Class: Amphibia
- Order: Anura
- Family: Bufonidae
- Genus: Sclerophrys
- Species: S. vittata

Binomial name
- Sclerophrys vittata (Boulenger, 1906)

Synonyms
- Bufo vittatus Boulenger, 1906; Amietophrynus vittatus (Boulenger, 1906)

Species of amphibian

Sclerophrys vittata, also known as Degen's toad, banded toad, or Lake Victoria toad, is a species of toad in the family Bufonidae. It is endemic to Uganda, where it is only known from Lira south to Entebbe and the Bwindi Impenetrable Forest. This species may possibly be found in Kenya and its range may even extend into Egypt, but the records from northern Egypt are generally regarded as belonging to S. kassasii.

== Description ==
Sclerophrys vittata is a small toad with long, narrow parotoid glands, distinctive dark-coloured longitudinal stripes and rows of large tubercles on its upper surface, and a bold patterning of red and dark blotches on its underside. In Egypt the snout vent length of the toads varied between 26 and 36 millimeters. No difference was found between males and females concerning body length.

== Distribution ==
Sclerophrys vittata is found in Uganda and was first described by George Albert Boulenger in 1906. Its range extends from Lira southwards to Entebbe and the Bwindi Impenetrable Forest. It has also been reported from Katera in the southern foothills of Mount Kenya, but this record is disputed. Some toads found between 1909 and 1912 near Alexandria in Egypt were originally identified as this species but may have been misidentified. From 1989 to 1991, Akef and Schneider investigated the reproductive behavior and analyzed the calls of Bufo vittatus in Egypt in the Al−Fayoum region. In 1993 a new species of toad was described by Sherif Baha el Din from the Nile Delta as Bufo kassasii, and it is thought the original identification of Sclerophrys vittata from Egypt referred to this new species, also known as the Nile Delta toad. However, it is possible that this species has a wider range including parts of the Nile Valley and into Egypt.

== Calls and calling activity ==
=== Calls ===
The mating calls have a simple structure. They consist of three to four very short pules separated by intervals. Calls have been recorded at water temperatures of 17 to 27 degrees Celsius. At 24 degrees water temperature the mean call duration measures 120 milliseconds, the intercall interval 300 milliseconds, the calls exhibit two frequency components at about 1100 and 2800 Hertz. There is a correlation between the water temperature and some call parameters. As the water temperature increases the duration of the calls decreases when the calls consisting of three or four pulses are considered separately. The intervals between the calls and between the pulses also decrease, whereas the pulse rate increases. The number of pulses per call and the duration of the pulses do not change.

=== Annual and daily calling activity ===
Calling of the males begins in the first half of February and lasts until October. It reaches a climax in spring and early summer. During this time calling begins shortly after sunset and lasts until 1 to 2 a.m. Later in summer calling ends earlier, around 10 to 11 p.m. and ends in September and October even earlier.

=== Calling behaviour ===
Calling males gather in small shallow ponds, irrigation canals and ditches, rice and corn fields. They form choruses consisting of about 20 males. The calling males maintain a minimum distance of about 0.7 meters. At decreasing calling activity during the year, males continue to form choruses, but the number of choruses decreases. Males call while sitting in the water, the body is erected, the hind limbs and the posterior part of the body are immersed in the water. The males have a single subgular vocal sac. When fully inflated, it is very large in relation to the body length. Pair formation is high in spring and early summer, later on it decreases, but pairs are observed until October.

== Status ==
Very little is known about this species and its natural history. It inhabits marshy areas and presumably its larvae are aquatic. Its population status, ecology and the threats it faces are unknown and the International Union for Conservation of Nature lists its conservation status as "data deficient".
