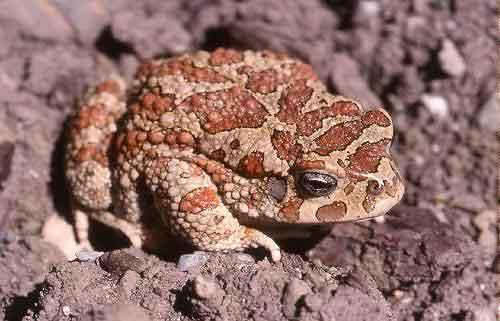

Conservation status
- Least Concern (IUCN 3.1)

Scientific classification
- Kingdom: Animalia
- Phylum: Chordata
- Class: Amphibia
- Order: Anura
- Family: Bufonidae
- Genus: Sclerophrys
- Species: S. mauritanica

Binomial name
- Sclerophrys mauritanica Schlegel, 1841

Synonyms
- Bufo pantherinus Tschudi, 1838; Bufo mauritanicus Schlegel, 1841; Amietophrynus mauritanicus (Schlegel, 1841)

= Berber toad =

Species of amphibian

The Berber toad, also known as Mauritanian toad, Moroccan toad, pantherine toad or Moorish toad (Sclerophrys mauritanica), is a species of toad in the family Bufonidae, which is found in north-western Africa, with an introduced population in southern Spain.

== Description ==
The Berber toad is a large toad, reaching 13–15 cm in body length. The upperparts are beige to olive with large orange or red spots. The underparts are white with small grey spots. It can be found in various colors depending on the locality, ranging from shades and patches of brown, reddish-brown, olive, orange, and even a plain sandy color.

== Distribution ==
The Berber toad is found in north western Africa, occurring in Morocco eastwards through Algeria into Tunisia, and south to the northernmost part of Western Sahara, although this has yet to be confirmed. An introduced population is also present in Spain close to Los Alcornocales Natural Park in the vicinity of Algeciras.

== Habitat ==
Its natural habitats are subtropical or tropical dry cork oak forests, subtropical or tropical dry shrubland, rivers, freshwater marshes, intermittent freshwater marshes, arable land, pastureland, plantations and urban areas. Berber toads range up to 2,650 m above sea level in the Atlas Mountains.

== Habits ==
It breeds in fresh or brackish still or slow-flowing bodies of water. The females deposit approximately 5,000–10,000 eggs. During the day the adults hide under rocks or in tunnels.

== Taxonomy ==
Originally placed in the genus Bufo but was placed in the African genus Amietophrynus for the former 20-chromosome "Bufo" in 2009 and then Amietophrynus was renamed Sclerophrys as the type species Sclerophrys capensis was named as such, so Amietophrynus is a junior synonym of Sclerophrys.
