= Poyntonophrynus kavangensis =

Conservation status
- Least Concern (IUCN 3.1)

Scientific classification
- Kingdom: Animalia
- Phylum: Chordata
- Class: Amphibia
- Order: Anura
- Family: Bufonidae
- Genus: Poyntonophrynus
- Species: P. kavangensis

Binomial name
- Poyntonophrynus kavangensis (Poynton & Broadley, 1988)

Synonyms
- Bufo kavangensis Poynton and Broadley, 1988

Species of amphibian

Poyntonophrynus kavangensis is a species of toad in the family Bufonidae. It is found in Angola, Botswana, Namibia, Zimbabwe, and presumably Zambia. Its natural habitats are sandy areas of grasslands. It is associated with ephemeral pools and pans. It can breed in hypersaline pans.
