= Poyntonophrynus grandisonae =

Conservation status
- Data Deficient (IUCN 3.1)

Scientific classification
- Kingdom: Animalia
- Phylum: Chordata
- Class: Amphibia
- Order: Anura
- Family: Bufonidae
- Genus: Poyntonophrynus
- Species: P. grandisonae

Binomial name
- Poyntonophrynus grandisonae (Poynton & Haacke, 1993)

Synonyms
- Bufo grandisonae Poynton & Haacke, 1993

Species of amphibian

Poyntonophrynus grandisonae (common name: Grandison's toad or Mossamedes toad) is a species of toad in the family Bufonidae. It is endemic to Namibe Province, Angola. Its range may be more widespread than currently known, including the nearby Iona National Park. It is only known from a few specimens because there has not been much research in the surrounding area, and thus its 2014 IUCN Red List of Threatened Species assessment remained at "Data Deficient".

It is named for Alice Georgie Cruickshank Grandison (born 1927), a Curator of Herpetology at Natural History Museum, London.

== Habitat ==
Its natural habitats are granitic inselbergs in dry, sandy area. Its breeding habitat is unknown.
