= John Hyacinth Power =

- Born: 2 November 1884
- Died: 21 December 1964 (aged 80)
- Academic career
- Fields: Herpetology, botany
- Institutions: Christian Brothers' College, Kimberley; McGregor Museum (director, 1947–1958)

John Hyacinth Power was the second Director of the McGregor Museum in Kimberley, South Africa.

Born in Waterford, Ireland on 2 November 1884, Power emigrated to South Africa in 1904 to take up a post as school master at Kimberley's Christian Brothers' College (now known as St Patrick's College). From 1920 he headed the South African School of Mines (later the Northern Cape Technical College).

== Early association with the McGregor Museum ==
Although Power would succeed Maria Wilman as museum director only in 1947, his close association with the museum began at the time of its inception in 1907. From 1917, moreover, he became the museum's honorary curator of reptiles and amphibians, herpetology being the field in which he achieved wide renown as a regional specialist. He had been encouraged in this direction by Dr Louis Péringuey, Director of the South African Museum in Cape Town. The first of some forty publications he wrote in various fields appeared in the Annals of the South African Museum in 1913. Amongst the specimens he collected are type specimens that are housed at the McGregor Museum, including Bufo poweri which was named in his honour. Two other amphibians are named for him, Hyperolius poweri and Breviceps poweri.

He also collected enthusiastically in other fields of museum science, notably archaeology, being one of the most prolific donors in this field over many decades. A major Acheulean site on the farm of Pniel on the Vaal River near Kimberley is known as “Power’s Site”.

== Director of the McGregor Museum in Kimberley ==
Power succeeded Wilman as Director of the McGregor Museum in 1947 and oversaw major expansion and changes in the administration of the institution during the decade that he was at the helm.

These included the erection of a new building across the road from the original McGregor Museum, made possible by a generous donation by the daughter of Alexander and Margaret McGregor, Helen Jessie Crawford. De Beers lent its support as well. Here Power was responsible for a set of state-of-the-art natural history dioramas, constructed with the help of artist Nellie Steenkamp.

Just months before his retirement in 1958 the Cape Provincial Administration took on the McGregor Museum as a Province-Aided institution, providing an annual grant for the running of the museum, and paying the salaries of its still small staff at public service levels. The Board of Trustees continued to run the museum as it had from the start, but was now able to look to the appointment of extra professional staff. For instance, Dr Gerhard Jurgen Fock was appointed at the McGregor Museum in 1958 as South Africa's first professional full-time museum archaeologist.

== Fellowships ==
Power was recognized for his contributions to science by being made a Fellow of the Royal Society of South Africa, in 1931. In the same year he was elected a Fellow of the Zoological Society of London. He was also a Fellow of the Linnaean Society. Power was President of Section F of the South African Association for the Advancement of Science in 1929 and of Section E in 1949; a founder member of the South African Archaeological Society in 1945; and a founder of the Wildlife Protection Society.

== Retirement ==
In retirement, Power lived for a time in Northern Rhodesia before settling in Pietermaritzburg. He died suddenly at his son's home in Johannesburg on 21 December 1964.
