= Sclerophrys villiersi =

Conservation status
- Vulnerable (IUCN 3.1)

Scientific classification
- Kingdom: Animalia
- Phylum: Chordata
- Class: Amphibia
- Order: Anura
- Family: Bufonidae
- Genus: Sclerophrys
- Species: S. villiersi

Binomial name
- Sclerophrys villiersi (Angel, 1940)

Synonyms
- Bufo villiersi Angel, 1940; Amietophrynus villiersi (Angel, 1940)

Species of amphibian

Sclerophrys villiersi is a species of toad in the family Bufonidae. It is endemic to western Cameroon. It occurs along fast-flowing streams in montane grasslands that sometimes contain gallery forest. During the day, it hides in holes. Breeding takes place in slow-flowing streams bordered with trees. It is threatened by habitat loss caused by smallholder farming activities, livestock ranching, timber extraction, and human settlement. It is not present in any protected areas.
