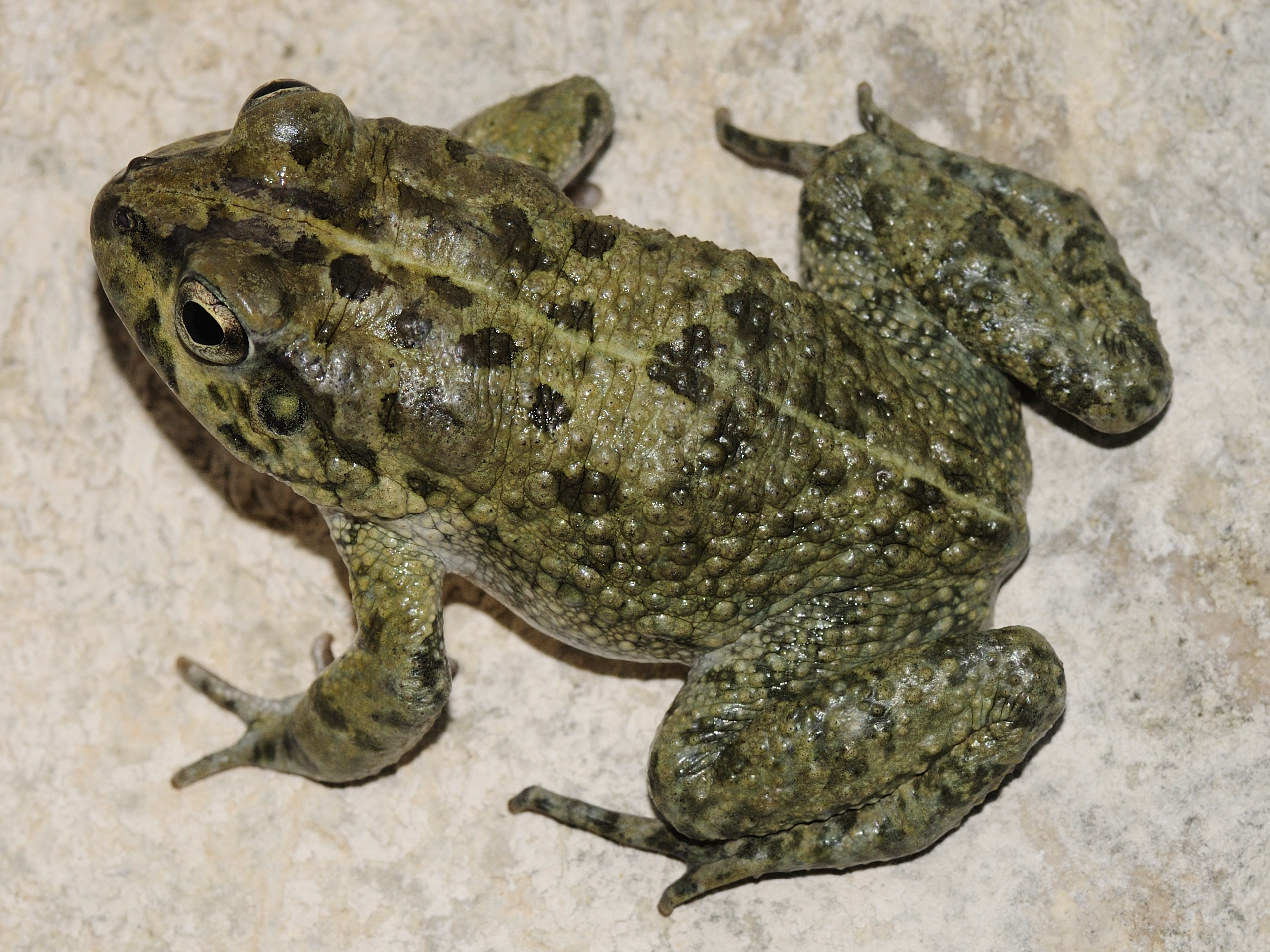

Conservation status
- Least Concern (IUCN 3.1)

Scientific classification
- Kingdom: Animalia
- Phylum: Chordata
- Class: Amphibia
- Order: Anura
- Family: Bufonidae
- Genus: Sclerophrys
- Species: S. arabica

Binomial name
- Sclerophrys arabica (Heyden, 1827)

Synonyms
- Bufo arabicus Heyden, 1827; Bufo hadramautinus Cherchi, 1963; Bufo viridis ssp. arabicus Mertens, 1967; Bufo viridis var. orientalis Werner, 1895; Duttaphrynus arabicus (Heyden, 1827)

= Arabian toad =

Species of amphibian

Sclerophrys arabica at night near a small pond in the Al Hajar Mountains

The Arabian toad (Sclerophrys arabica) is a species of toad in the family Bufonidae. It is endemic to the Arabian Peninsula and is found in Oman, Saudi Arabia, the United Arab Emirates, and Yemen.

Only nine species of amphibians have been found on the Arabian Peninsula, and this toad is one of only two species found in the United Arab Emirates.

== Description ==
The Arabian toad has a rounded head and snout, prominent eyes and small tympanic membranes. Its back is covered with small warts and it varies in colour, being grey, tan, brown or green, often with golden speckles. The male is generally smaller than the female. The long croak of the male sounds like a rusty door hinge.

== Distribution and habitat ==
This species is endemic to the Arabian Peninsula. Its range includes several widely separated locations in northwestern, central and southwestern Saudi Arabia, the Farasan Islands in the Red Sea, western and southern Yemen, the United Arab Emirates and northern Oman. Its altitudinal range runs from sea level to about 2,300 m (7,500 ft). It is a common species where the conditions are suitable and is found in oases, springs, irrigation ditches, watercourses, ponds and gardens. In the United Arab Emirates it is often found in mountain pools and may bury itself by digging holes in damp gravel in wadis.

== Ecology ==
The Arabian toad can be active at any time of day or night. It is well camouflaged and may hide in crevices, animal burrows or other concealed locations. It feeds on insects and small invertebrates, and sometimes larger toads eat small juveniles. It may consume small fish in drying-out ephemeral pools, swallowing them whole because, having no teeth it is unable to chew. This toad breeds opportunistically at any time of year in stationary or slow-moving water, depositing strings of black eggs in the water.

Under adverse conditions, this toad can bury itself in the ground and aestivate, remaining dormant until rain falls or conditions improve. It has been known to aestivate for as long as three years at a time. Stimulated by changing conditions, all the toads may emerge at once and congregate in great numbers in suitable places to breed. The carpet viper and Brandt's hedgehog prey on the Arabian toad and seem to be unharmed by the noxious secretions it produces.

== Status ==
B. arabicus is a common species around suitable water bodies within its range and seems able to adapt to a range of habitat types. No particular threats are known and much of its range is well away from human habitations. The Farasan Islands are a protected area of Saudi Arabia. The International Union for Conservation of Nature has assessed this toad's conservation status as being of "least concern".
