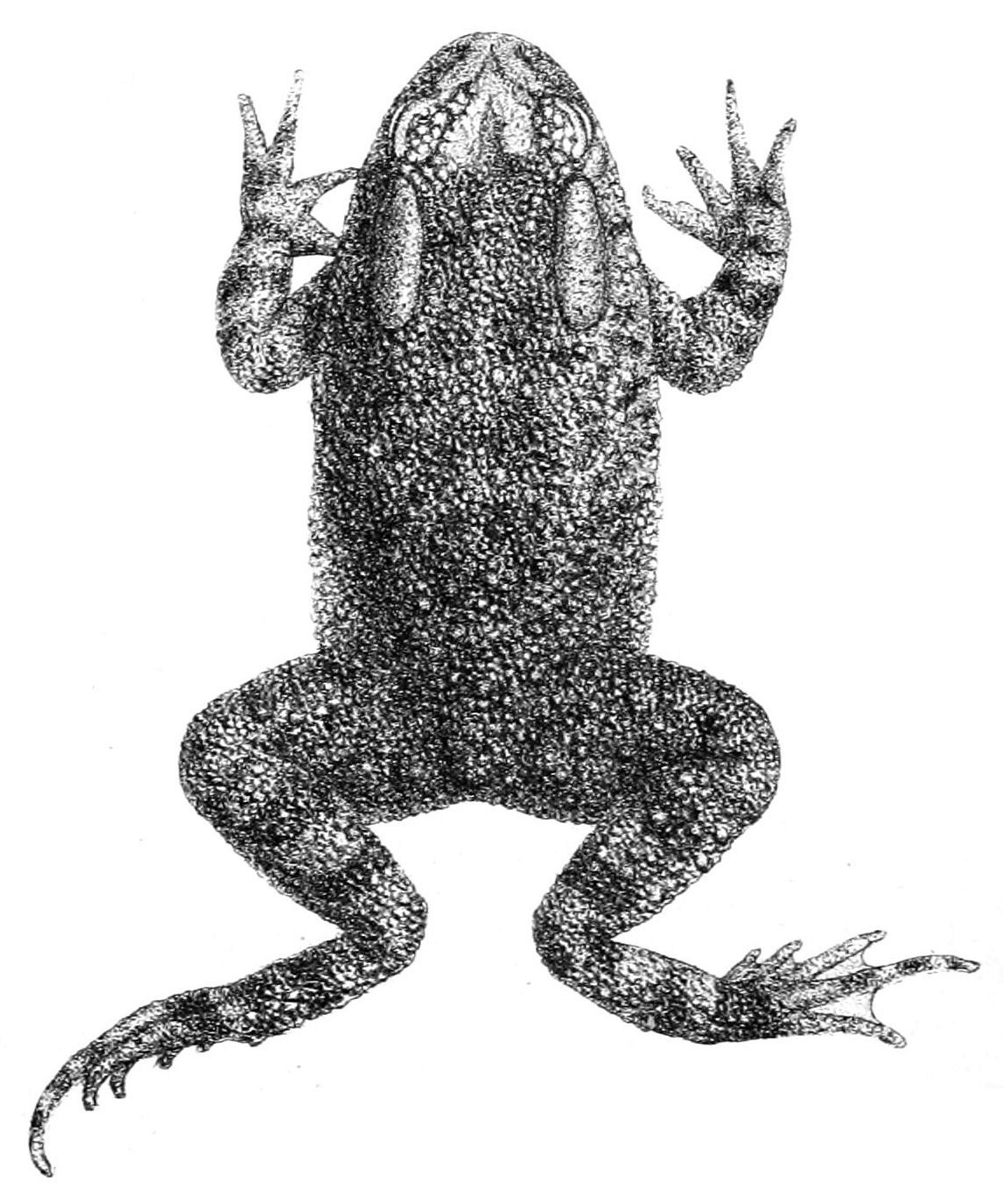

Conservation status
- Least Concern (IUCN 3.1)

Scientific classification
- Kingdom: Animalia
- Phylum: Chordata
- Class: Amphibia
- Order: Anura
- Family: Bufonidae
- Genus: Sclerophrys
- Species: S. funerea

Binomial name
- Sclerophrys funerea (Bocage, 1866)

Synonyms
- Bufo funereus (Bocage, 1866); Amietophrynus funereus (Bocage, 1866); Bufo benguelensis Boulenger, 1882; Bufo berghei Laurent, 1950

= Sclerophrys funerea =

Species of amphibian

Sclerophrys funerea is a species of toad in the family Bufonidae. It is found in west-central Africa, from Gabon, Republic of the Congo, and Angola eastward through the Democratic Republic of the Congo to Uganda, Rwanda, and Burundi. Its common names are Angola toad or somber toad.

This species occurs in rainforests, usually on slightly drier areas such as ridge tops. It is a leaf litter species. The eggs are deposited in slow-flowing streams during the dry season. It tolerates a slight degree of habitat degradation. Habitat loss is a localized threat.
