= Subdesert toad =

Subdesert Toad

Conservation status
- Least Concern (IUCN 3.1)

Scientific classification
- Kingdom: Animalia
- Phylum: Chordata
- Class: Amphibia
- Order: Anura
- Family: Bufonidae
- Genus: Sclerophrys
- Species: S. xeros

Binomial name
- Sclerophrys xeros (Tandy, Tandy, Keith & Duff-MacKay, 1976)

Synonyms
- Amietophrynus xeros (Tandy, Tandy, Keith & Duff-MacKay, 1976); Bufo wazae Hulselmans, 1977; Bufo xeros Tandy, Tandy, Keith & Duff-MacKay, 1976

Species of amphibian

The subdesert toad (Sclerophrys xeros) is a species of toad in the family Bufonidae. It is found in Algeria, Cameroon, Chad, Djibouti, Eritrea, Ethiopia, Gambia, Guinea, Kenya, Libya, Mali, Mauritania, Niger, Senegal, Somalia, Sudan, Tanzania, Uganda, Western Sahara, possibly Angola, possibly Benin, possibly Burkina Faso, possibly Central African Republic, possibly Democratic Republic of the Congo, possibly Guinea-Bissau, and possibly Nigeria. Its natural habitats are dry savanna, subtropical or tropical dry shrubland, subtropical or tropical dry lowland grassland, intermittent rivers, intermittent freshwater marshes, freshwater springs, hot deserts, and arable land. Its conservation status is assessed by the International Union for Conservation of Nature as being of "least concern".

== Description ==
The subdesert toad is a medium-sized species with a broad head and blunt snout. The dorsal surface bears conical warts tipped with black spines. This toad varies in colour from cream or pale grey to dark brown and has three pairs of symmetrical dark-edged markings and various other dark blotches. The underparts are cream with variable amounts of mottling. Females have pale throats while those of males are darker, and males also have vocal sacs on the throat and some irregular red markings on the outer thighs.

== Behaviour ==
The subdesert toad lives in arid regions and may aestivate for long periods. In northwestern Africa it is active between September and March with breeding taking place in September and October, clutches of eggs being laid in temporary ponds and pools in river beds. it is mainly nocturnal and feeds on small invertebrates such as spiders, beetles and other insects.
