= Sclerophrys pentoni =

Conservation status
- Least Concern (IUCN 3.1)

Scientific classification
- Kingdom: Animalia
- Phylum: Chordata
- Class: Amphibia
- Order: Anura
- Family: Bufonidae
- Genus: Sclerophrys
- Species: S. pentoni

Binomial name
- Sclerophrys pentoni (Anderson, 1893)

Synonyms
- Bufo pentoni Anderson, 1893

Species of amphibian

Sclerophrys pentoni is a species of toad in the family Bufonidae found in western and central Africa. Its natural habitats are dry savanna, subtropical or tropical dry shrubland, subtropical or tropical dry lowland grassland, rivers, intermittent freshwater marshes, and hot deserts. It is threatened by habitat loss.
