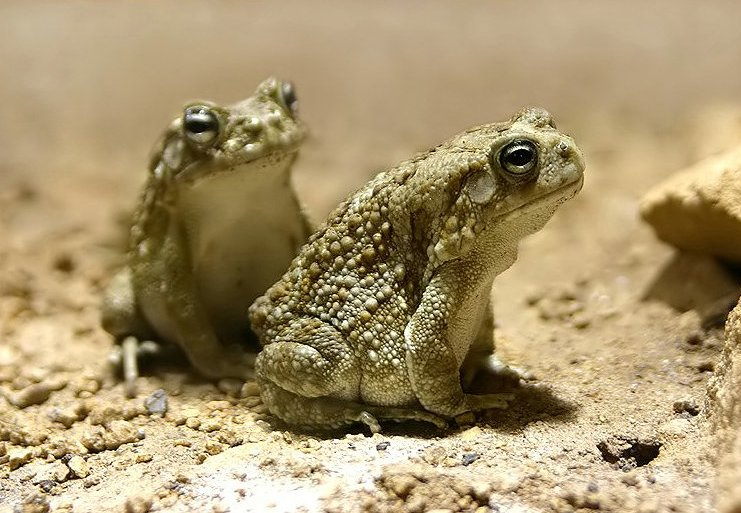
- Sclerophrys regularis

Scientific classification
- Kingdom: Animalia
- Phylum: Chordata
- Class: Amphibia
- Order: Anura
- Family: Bufonidae
- Genus: Sclerophrys; Tschudi, 1838

Type species
- Sclerophrys capensis Tschudi, 1838

Species
- See text.

Synonyms
- Amietophrynus Frost et al., 2006

= Sclerophrys =

Genus of amphibians

Sclerophrys is a genus of "true toads", family Bufonidae, native to Africa and the southern Arabian Peninsula. Originally, all of these species were classified in the genus Bufo. The genus, originally named Amietophrynus, was split due to large enough taxonomic divergence. Ohler and Dubois showed in 2016 that Sclerophrys capensis Tschudi, 1838 is the same species as Bufo regularis rangeri Hewitt, 1935, the type species of Amietophrynus. Because the former name is older, the implication is that Amietophrynus is a junior synonym of Sclerophrys.

== Species ==
The following species are recognized in the genus Sclerophrys.

Binomial name and author	Common name(s)
Sclerophrys arabica (Heyden, 1827)	Arabian toad
Sclerophrys asmarae (Tandy, Bogart, Largen & Feener, 1982)	Asmara toad
Sclerophrys blanfordii (Boulenger, 1882)	Blanford's toad
Sclerophrys brauni (Nieden, 1911)	Braun's toad, dead-leaf toad
Sclerophrys buchneri (Peters, 1882)	Buchner's toad
Sclerophrys camerunensis (Parker, 1936)	Oban toad
Sclerophrys capensis Tschudi, 1838	Raucous toad
Sclerophrys channingi (Barej et al., 2011)	Congolese giant toad
Sclerophrys chevalieri (Mocquard, 1908)	West African horned toad
Sclerophrys danielae (Perret, 1977)	Ivory Coast toad
Sclerophrys djohongensis (Hulselmans, 1977)
Sclerophrys dodsoni (Boulenger, 1895)	Dodson's toad
Sclerophrys fuliginata (Witte, 1932)	Shaba Province toad, sooty toad
Sclerophrys funerea (Bocage, 1866)	Angola toad, somber toad
Sclerophrys garmani (Meek, 1897)	Garman's toad, olive toad, northern mottled toad
Sclerophrys gracilipes (Boulenger, 1899)	French Congo toad
Sclerophrys gutturalis (Power, 1927)	Lobatsi toad, guttural toad, square-marked toad
Sclerophrys kassasii (Baha El Din, 1993)	Damietta toad
Sclerophrys kerinyagae (Keith, 1968)	Keith's toad
Sclerophrys kisoloensis (Loveridge, 1932)	Kisolo toad
Sclerophrys langanoensis (Largen, Tandy & Tandy, 1978)	Lake Langano toad
Sclerophrys latifrons (Boulenger, 1900)	high tropical forest toad
Sclerophrys lemairii (Boulenger, 1901)	Pweto toad, Lemaire's toad, yellow swamp toad
Sclerophrys maculata (Hallowell, 1854)	Hallowell's toad, flat-backed toad, striped toad
Sclerophrys mauritanica (Schlegel, 1841)	Berber toad, Moroccan toad
Sclerophrys pantherina (Smith, 1828)	western leopard toad, panther toad, southern panther toad
Sclerophrys pardalis (Hewitt, 1935)	eastern leopard toad, Gleniffer toad, august toad, snoring toad
Sclerophrys pentoni (Anderson, 1893)	Penton's toad
Sclerophrys perreti (Schiøtz, 1963)	Perret's toad
Sclerophrys poweri (Hewitt, 1935)	Kimberley toad, Power's toad
Sclerophrys pusilla (Mertens, 1937)	Flat-backed toad
Sclerophrys reesi (Poynton, 1977)	Merera toad
Sclerophrys regularis (Reuss, 1833)	square-marked toad, African toad
Sclerophrys steindachneri (Pfeffer, 1893)	Steindachner's toad
Sclerophrys superciliaris (Boulenger, 1888)	Zaire toad, Cameroon toad
Sclerophrys taiensis (Rödel and Ernst, 2000)	Tai toad
Sclerophrys tihamica (Balletto and Cherchi, 1973)	Balletto's toad
Sclerophrys togoensis (Ahl, 1924)	Togo toad
Sclerophrys tuberosa (Günther, 1858)	Fernando Po toad
Sclerophrys turkanae (Tandy & Feener, 1985)	Lake Turkana toad
Sclerophrys urunguensis (Loveridge, 1932)	Urungu toad
Sclerophrys villiersi (Angel, 1940)	Villier's toad
Sclerophrys vittata (Boulenger, 1906)	banded toad, Degen's toad
Sclerophrys xeros (Tandy, Tandy, Keith & Duff-MacKay, 1976)	Subsaharan toad, Waza toad, savannah toad
