= Monogaga Classified Forest =

Protected area in Ivory Coast

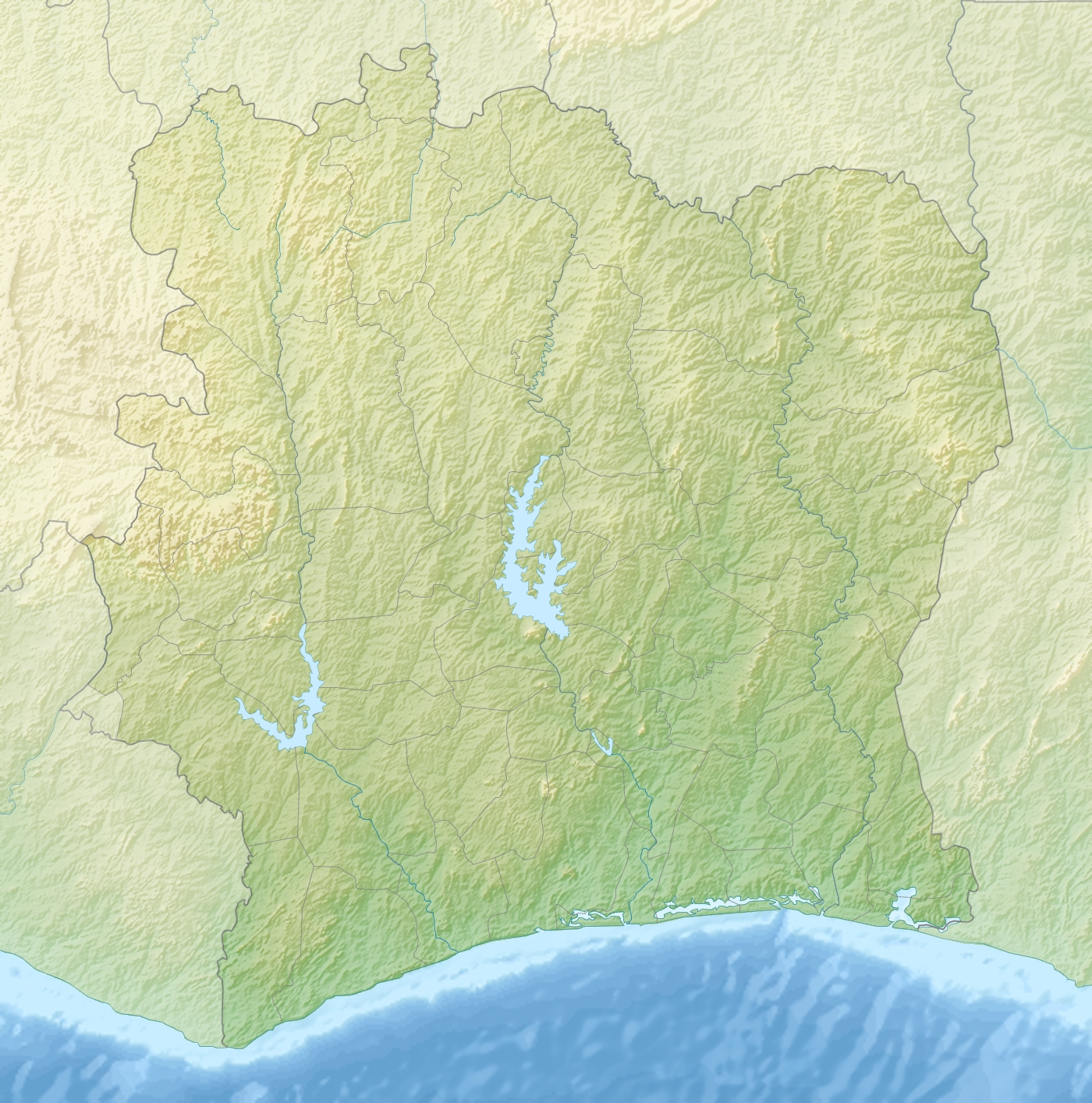
- Location within Ivory Coast
- Location: Ivory Coast
- Nearest city: San Pédro
- Coordinates: 4°45′43″N 6°38′14″W
- Area: 350 km^{2} (140 sq mi)
- Established: 1973

The Monogaga Classified Forest is found in the Sassandra and San-Pédro Departments of Ivory Coast, and covers 350 km^{2}. Parts of the forest are managed as protected areas where all exploitation is banned, whereas farmers are allowed to grow crops in other parts.

== Mammals ==
The classified forest of Monogaga might still hold a chimpanzee population of over 100 individuals.
