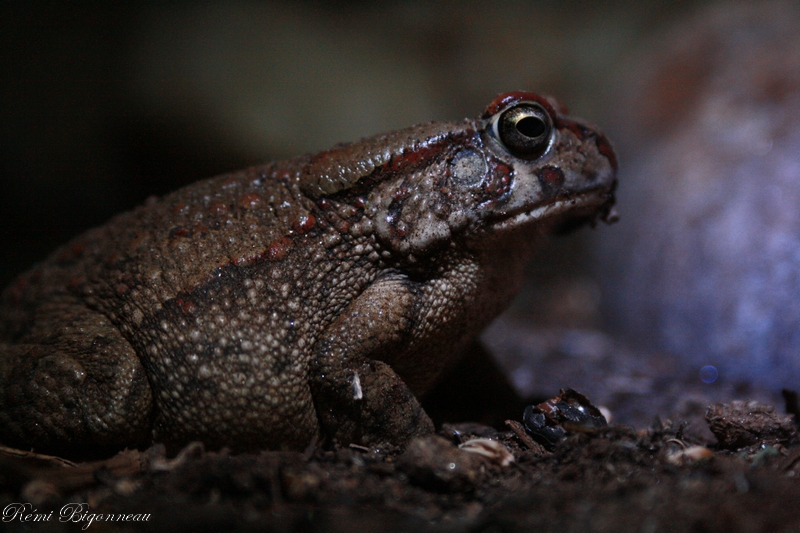

Conservation status
- Least Concern (IUCN 3.1)

Scientific classification
- Kingdom: Animalia
- Phylum: Chordata
- Class: Amphibia
- Order: Anura
- Family: Bufonidae
- Genus: Sclerophrys
- Species: S. poweri

Binomial name
- Sclerophrys poweri (Hewitt, 1935)

Synonyms
- Bufo regularis poweri Hewitt, 1935; Bufo poweri – Pienaar, 1963; Amietophrynus poweri (Hewitt, 1935)

= Sclerophrys poweri =

Species of amphibian

Sclerophrys poweri is a species of toad in the family Bufonidae. It is found in extreme southern Angola, northern Namibia, Botswana, southward to central South Africa, and Zambia. The specific name poweri honours John Hyacinth Power, Irish-born director of the McGregor Museum (Kimberley, South Africa) who collected amphibians as well as reptiles and plants.

Sclerophrys poweri inhabits open savanna, wooded savanna, thornveldt, river valleys, and agricultural areas. Breeding takes place in temporary water (vleis, marshes, dams, or pans), and sometimes artificial pools. It is a common and often abundant species that is not facing any significant threats and that is present in many protected areas.
