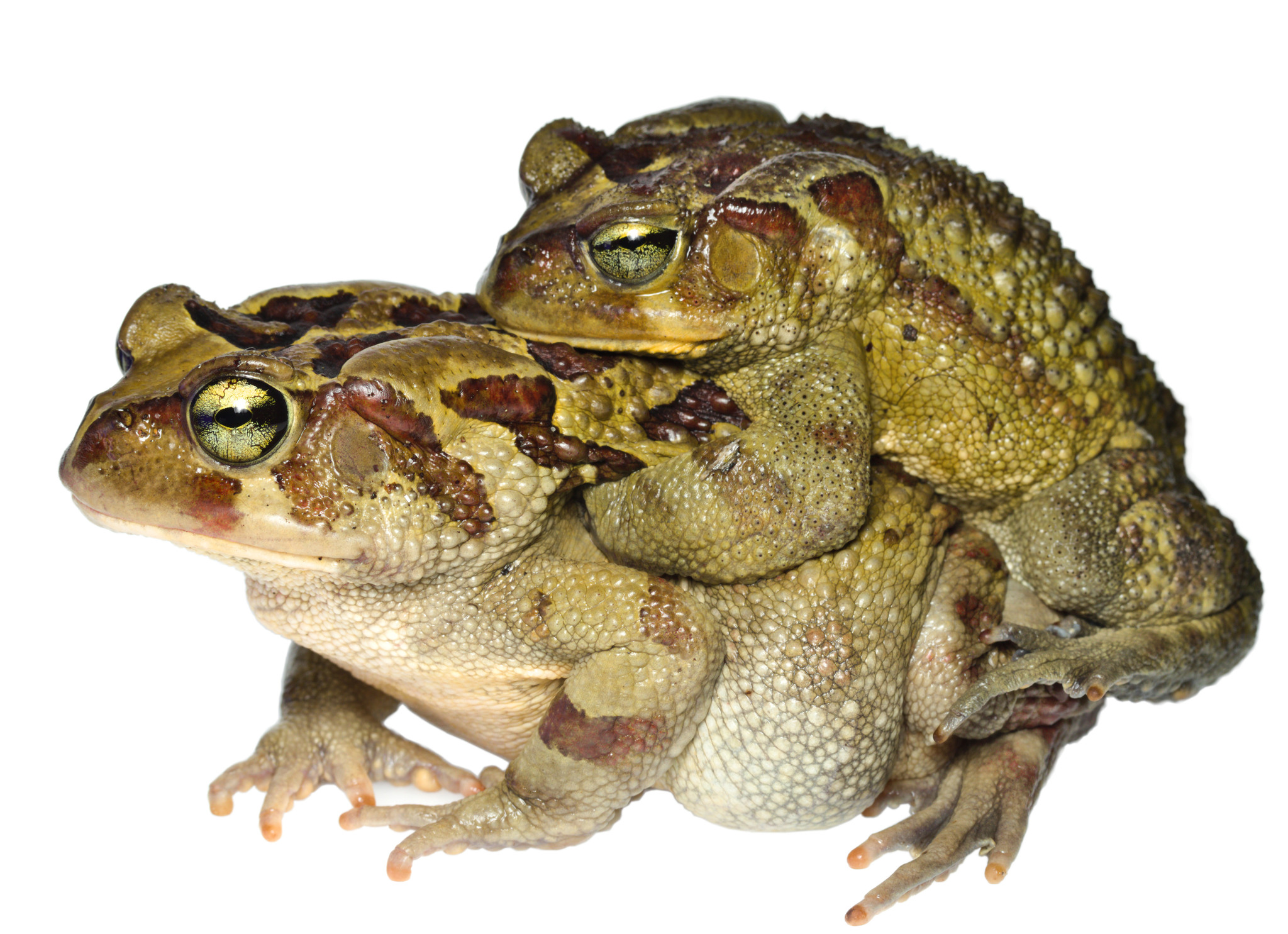
- S. pardalis are mating

Conservation status
- Least Concern (IUCN 3.1)

Scientific classification
- Kingdom: Animalia
- Phylum: Chordata
- Class: Amphibia
- Order: Anura
- Family: Bufonidae
- Genus: Sclerophrys
- Species: S. pardalis

Binomial name
- Sclerophrys pardalis (Hewitt, 1935)

Synonyms
- Amietophrynus pardalis; Bufo pardalis

= Eastern leopard toad =

Species of amphibian

The eastern leopard toad (Sclerophrys pardalis) is a species of toad in the family Bufonidae. It is endemic to South Africa. Its natural habitats are temperate shrubland, subtropical or tropical dry shrubland, subtropical or tropical dry lowland grassland, rural gardens, and urban areas. It is threatened by habitat loss.

== Range ==
This species, which is native to South Africa, is known mainly from the Eastern Cape Province east to Umtata in the former Transkei, with a few records from the Western Cape Province. It is mainly found quite close to the coast, but it ranges inland to Grahamstown, Kei Road, Stutterheim and Amatola Mountains. It is generally below 1,000 m asl, but ranges up to 1,500 m asl in some places.

== Mating ==
The eastern leopard toad typically breeds in large, permanent, usually deep pools, and calls from floating vegetation. The eastern leopard toad typically is a late-winter or spring breeder

== Diet ==
The eastern leopard toad is presumed to feed on a variety of arthropods in the wild. In captivity specimens feed on crickets, grasshoppers, small mice, and lizards.

== Sources ==
- Burger, M Amietophrynus pardalis (Hewitt, 1935)
