= Parotoid gland =

External skin gland on some amphibians

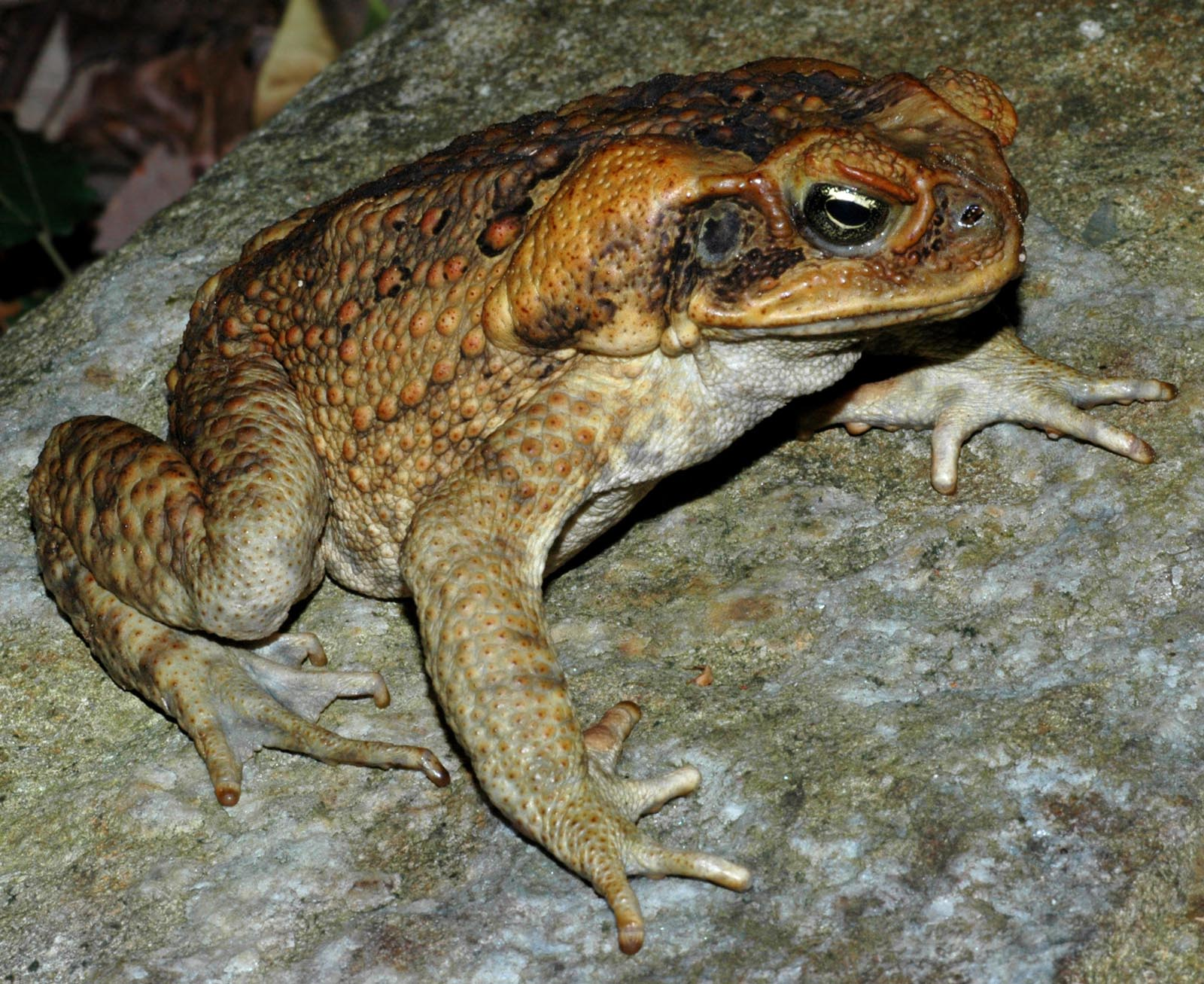
The parotoid gland can be seen just behind the tympanum (ear) of this cane toad.

The parotoid gland (alternatively, paratoid gland) is a type of external skin gland on the back, neck and shoulder of some frogs (especially toads) and salamanders, which can secrete a number of milky alkaloid substances (depending on the species) known collectively as bufotoxins, which act as neurotoxins to deter predation. These glands are called parotoid as they are somewhat similarly positioned to the mammalian parotid glands, although the latter have a different function of excreting serous, enzymic saliva to aid mastication and digestion, rather than to excrete external defensive chemicals.

A study of the parotoid glands of the Colorado River toad in 1976 found that the parotoid glands were "composed of numerous lobules", each of which is a separate unit with a lumen surrounded by a double cell layer. The cell layers have interlocking microvilli. The study found that the outer cell layer resembled smooth muscle cells, with some organelles hypothesised to "function in some aspects of venom synthesis, active cellular transport and contraction in the discharge of the secretory product". The inner layer was hypothesised to be "involved in venom formation and release". The study noted that the structure of the parotoid glands of the Colorado River toad is very different from the structure of the same glands in the cane toad. There is extensive blood supply to the parotoid glands to deliver cholesterol and other toxin precursor chemicals to the gland.

Parotoid glands are sometimes said to be wart-like in appearance, though warts are abnormal growths caused by viral infections while parotoid glands are normal, healthy parts of the animals that bear them. The vague similarity in appearance, however, is the reason behind the mistaken belief that touching a toad causes warts.

== See also ==
- Bufotoxin
- True toad
