= Wildlife of Guinea =

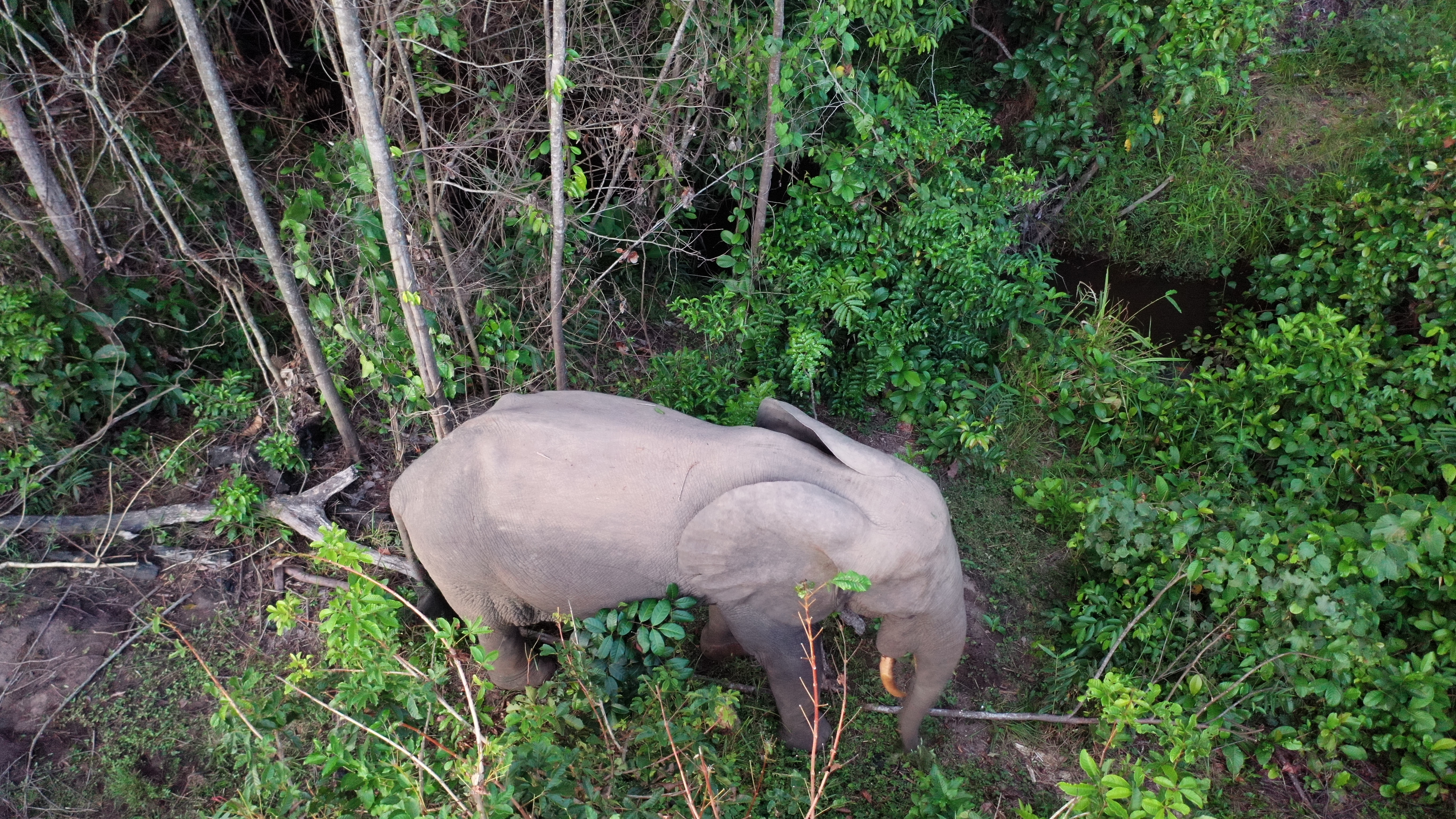
African forest elephant

The wildlife of Guinea is very diverse due to its wide variety of habitats. The southern part of the country lies within the Guinean Forests of West Africa biodiversity hotspot, while the north-east is characterized by dry savanna woodlands. Ecoregions of Guinea are the Western Guinean lowland forests, Guinean montane forests, Guinean forest–savanna mosaic, West Sudanian savanna, and Guinean mangroves.

Populations of large mammals are restricted to uninhabited distant parts of parks and reserves, and those populations are declining. Strongholds of Guinean wildlife are Pinselly Classified Forest, National Park of Upper Niger, Badiar National Park, Mount Nimba Strict Nature Reserve, Ziama Massif, Bossou Hills Reserve, and Diécké Classified Forest.

== Fauna ==
=== Mammals ===
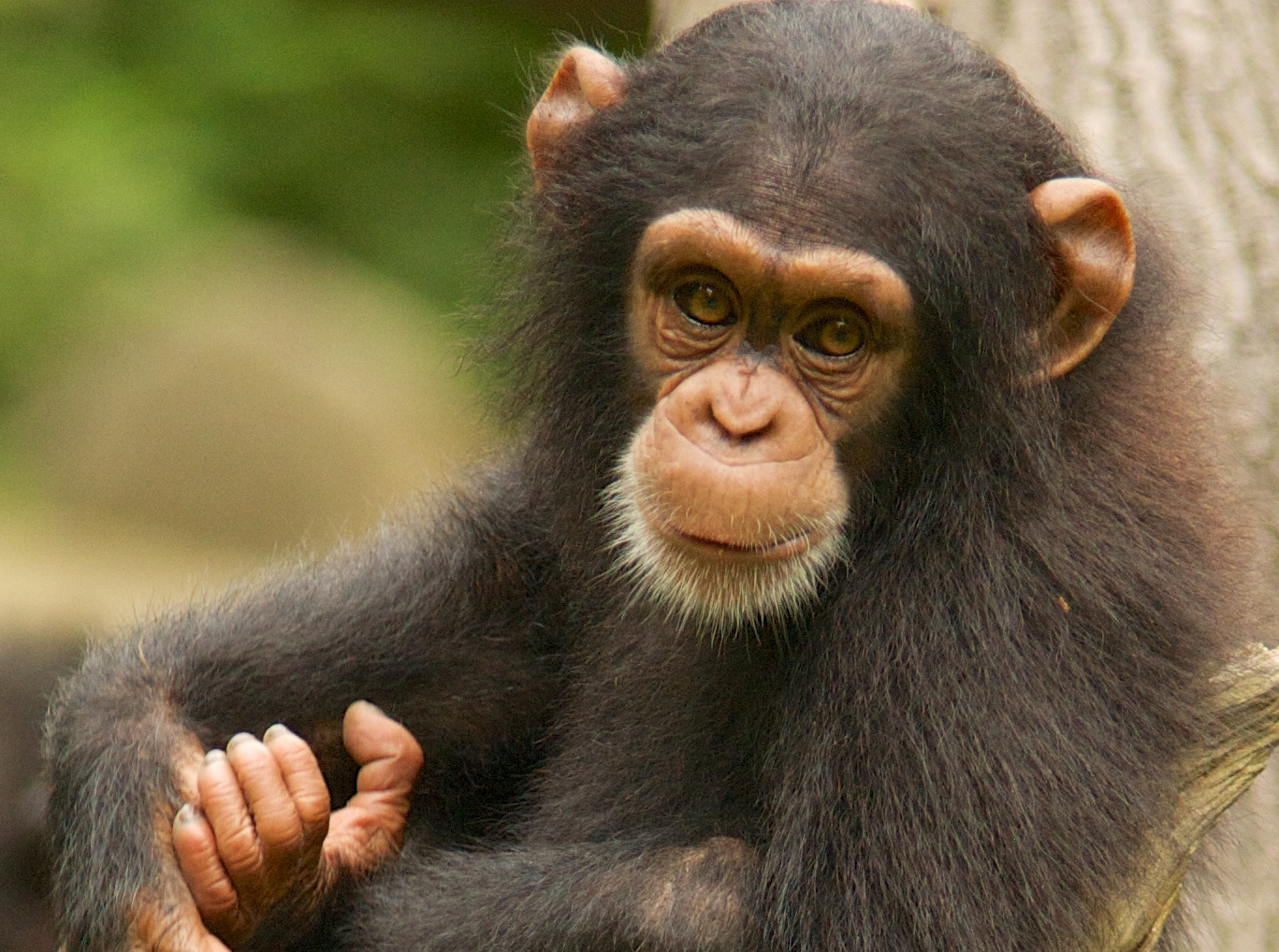
Western chimpanzee

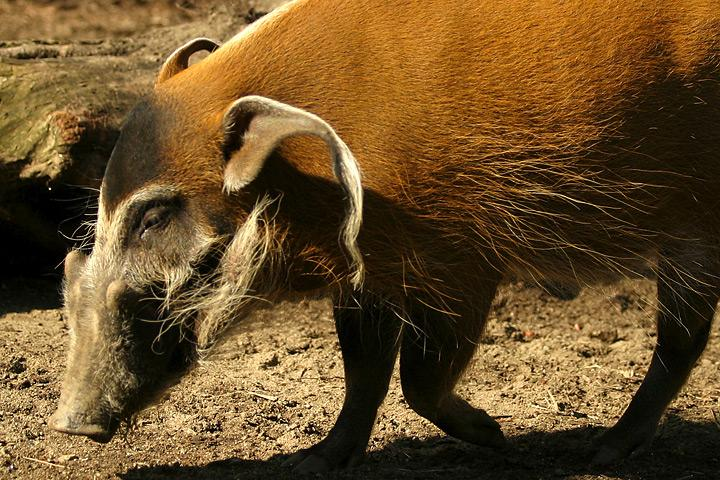
Red river hog

- African buffalo
- African forest buffalo
- African forest elephant
- Harnessed bushbuck
- Guinea baboon
- Giant forest hog
- Hippopotamus
- Pygmy hippopotamus
- Red river hog
- Royal antelope
- West African lion
- Western chimpanzee
- Western giant eland
- Western bongo
- Zebra duiker

=== Birds ===
- Blue-headed wood-dove
- Iris glossy-starling
- White-necked rockfowl
- White-breasted guineafowl

=== Reptiles ===
- Atractaspis aterrima
- African puff adder
- African rock python
- Ball python
- Dwarf crocodile
- Bitis rhinoceros
- Nile monitor
- Savannah monitor
- Slender-snouted crocodile
- West African crocodile
- Western green mamba
- Hormonotus
- West African mud turtle
- White-headed dwarf gecko

=== Amphibians ===
- Arthroleptis bivittatus
- Arthroleptis crusculum
- Arthroleptis poecilonotus
- Astylosternus occidentalis
- Aubria subsigillata
- Conraua alleni
- Geotrypetes angeli
- Geotrypetes pseudoangeli
- Hylarana fonensis
- Hyperolius concolor
- Hyperolius fusciventris
- Hyperolius guttulatus
- Hyperolius igbettensis
- Hyperolius nitidulus
- Hyperolius occidentalis
- Hyperolius picturatus
- Hyperolius soror
- Hyperolius wermuthi
- Kassina cochranae
- Kassina fusca
- Kassina schioetzi
- Leptopelis macrotis
- Leptopelis spiritusnoctis
- Leptopelis viridis
- Merlin's dwarf gray frog
- Mount Nimba screeching frog
- Nigeria banana frog
- Nimbaphrynoides occidentalis
- Odontobatrachus
- Phlyctimantis boulengeri
- Phrynobatrachus guineensis
- Phrynobatrachus phyllophilus
- Ptychadena pujoli
- Ptychadena submascareniensis
- Ptychadena tournieri
- Ptychadena trinodis

=== Insects ===
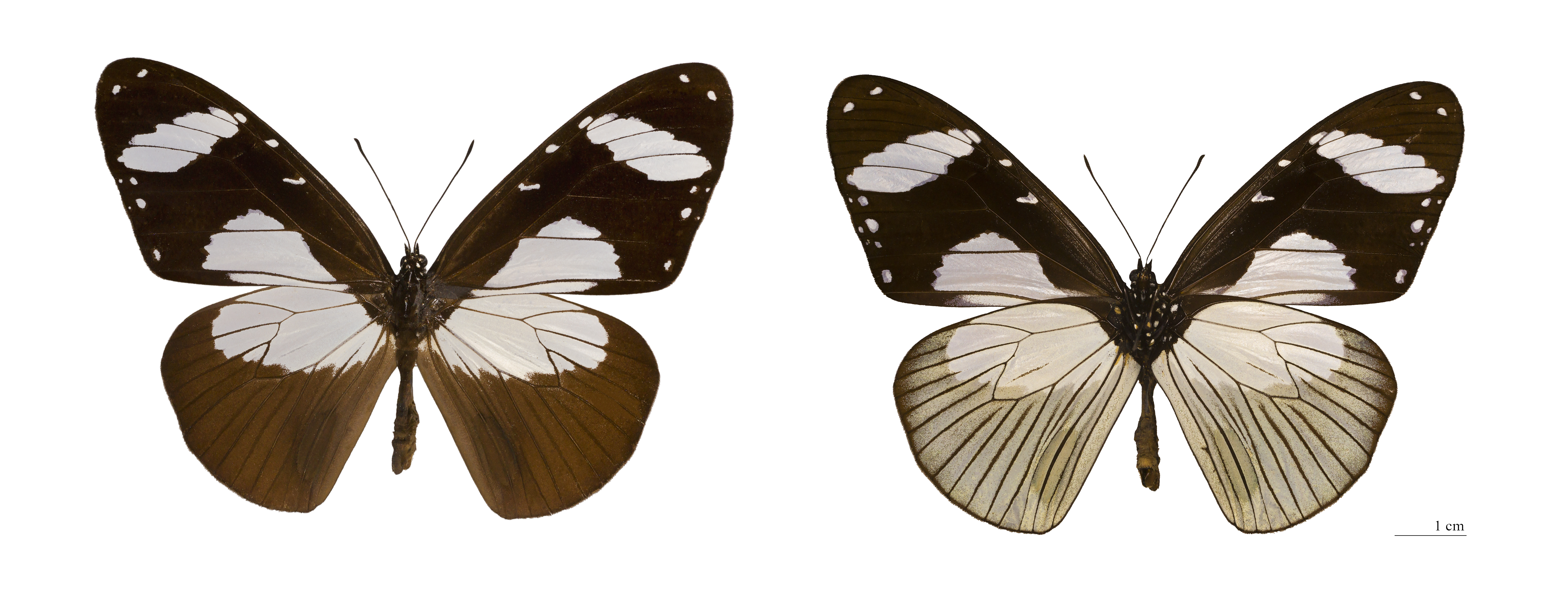
Amauris niavius - museum specimen
