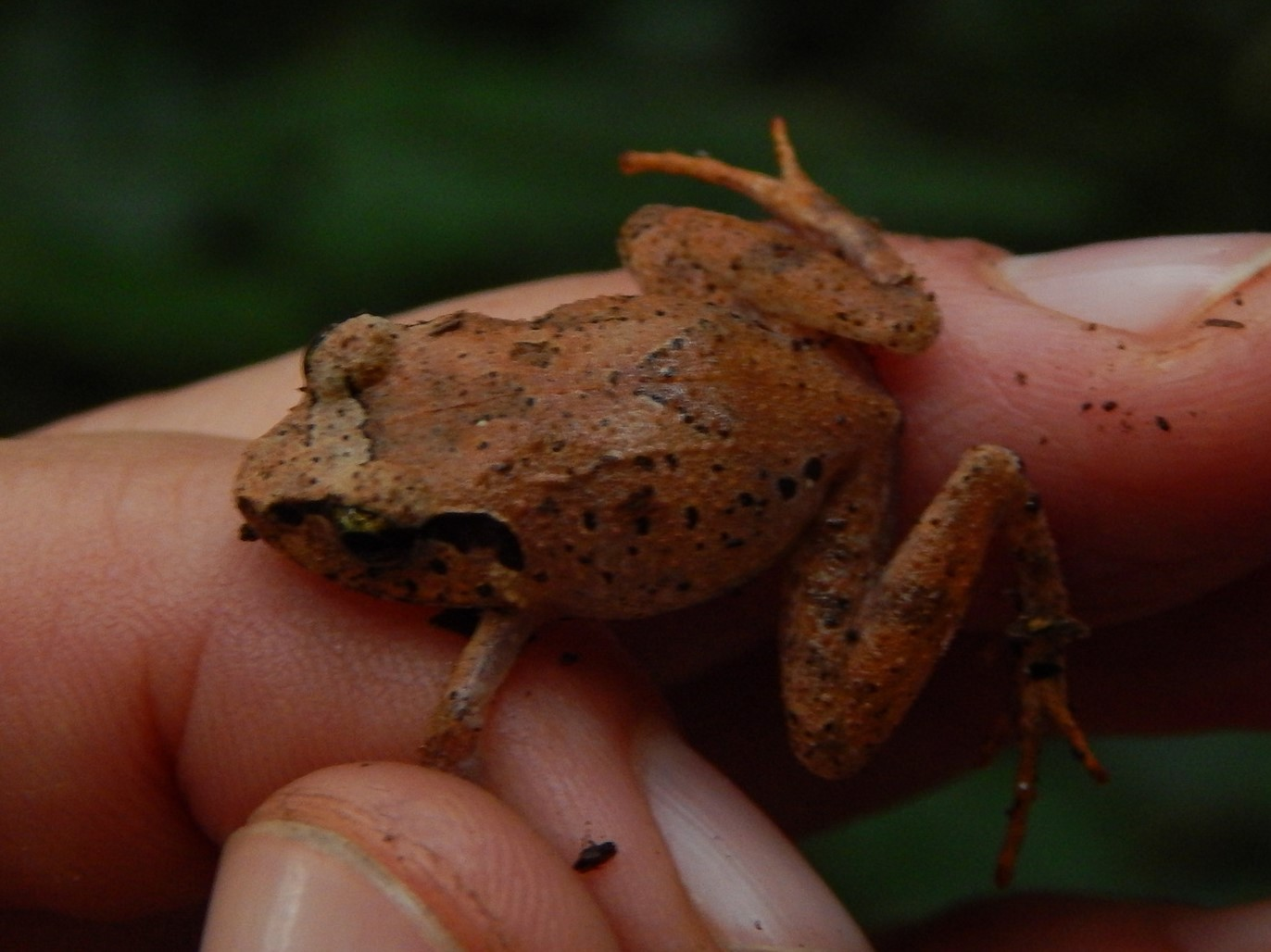

Conservation status
- Endangered (IUCN 3.1)

Scientific classification
- Kingdom: Animalia
- Phylum: Chordata
- Class: Amphibia
- Order: Anura
- Family: Arthroleptidae
- Genus: Arthroleptis
- Species: A. tanneri

Binomial name
- Arthroleptis tanneri Grandison, 1983

= Arthroleptis tanneri =

Species of amphibian

Arthroleptis tanneri, the Tanzania screeching frog or Tanner's squeaker, is a species of frog in the family Arthroleptidae. It is endemic to the West Usambara Mountains in northeastern Tanzania; previous records from elsewhere refer to other species.

== Etymology ==
The specific name tanneri honours Mr John Tanner, owner of a tea estate in Mazumbai, (the type locality) "in recognition of the generosity and hospitality afforded the collectors and other zoologists and his keen interest in the natural history of Mazumbai."

== Description ==
Males in the type series measure on average 34 mm (1.3 in) and females 51 mm (2.0 in) in snout–vent length. With a maximum snout-vent length of 55 mm (2.2 in), it is the largest of the Arthroleptis species. The body is stoutly built. The head is slightly broader than long, with snout rounded in dorsal view. The canthus rostralis is sharp. The tympanum is clearly visible. The toes are long, slender, and without webbing. The skin is usually smooth, although a juvenile had small scattered dorsal warts. The dorsum is claret-brown, with the chain of darker vertebral markings. The hands and feet are pinkish, especially from under. The upper half of iris is pale gold.

Arthroleptis tanneri resembles Arthroleptis affinis in colouration and morphology, but molecular data suggest that they are not closely related.

== Habitat and conservation ==
The natural habitats of Arthroleptis tanneri are montane forests at elevations of 1,400–2,000 m (4,600–6,600 ft) above sea level. It is in a leaf-litter species that has not been recorded outside good-quality forest. It is presumed to have direct development (i.e., no free-living tadpole stage), like all the other Arthroleptis species.

Population trends of this species are unknown but it is believed to be in decline because of habitat loss and deterioration, which are caused by expanding agriculture, wood extraction, and human settlements. The species occurs in the Mazumbai, Baga II, Shume-Magamba Forest Reserves, although all these would need further protection. In 2015 the International Union for Conservation of Nature (IUCN) assessed it as "Endangered" because of its small distribution area and the ongoing habitat loss and deterioration.

== Behavior ==
Screeching Frogs all share a similar behavior that "scream" to startle predators off that can last up to 5 seconds and sounds often like a crying baby. They usually reside on the north-eastern mountains of West Usambara. Feeding and mating most often takes place after a rainfall. During a sunny day they can be seen active under the shaded areas under trees. They will also fight with other males during breeding season to hold a territory to mate with a female.
