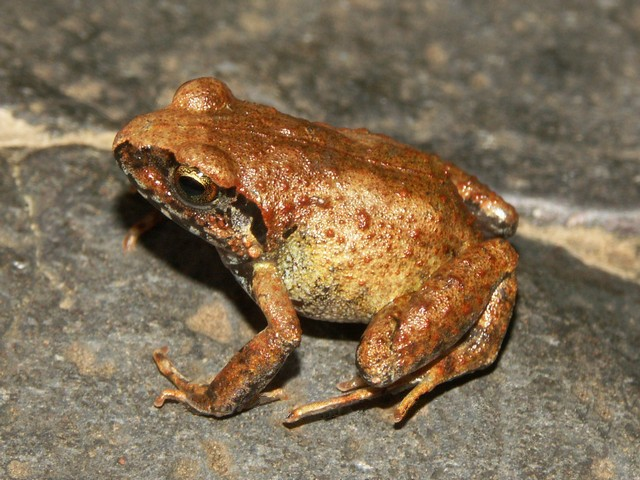

Conservation status
- Least Concern (IUCN 3.1)

Scientific classification
- Kingdom: Animalia
- Phylum: Chordata
- Class: Amphibia
- Order: Anura
- Family: Arthroleptidae
- Genus: Arthroleptis
- Species: A. palava

Binomial name
- Arthroleptis palava Blackburn, Gvoždík, and Leaché, 2010

= Arthroleptis palava =

Species of frog

Arthroleptis palava, also known as the problem squeaker frog or simply problem squeaker, is a species of frog in the family Arthroleptidae. It is found in the highlands of northern Cameroon and eastern Nigeria. The specific name palava is a Central/West-African pidgin word meaning "problem" and alludes to the past confusion of this species with the morphologically similar Arthroleptis poecilonotus.

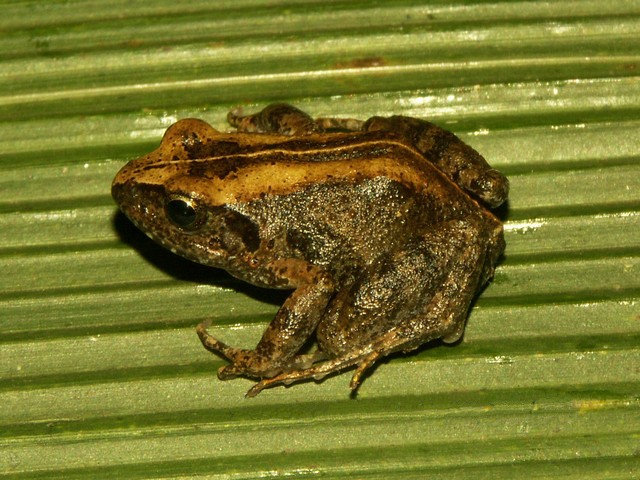
A specimen with a mid-dorsal stripe

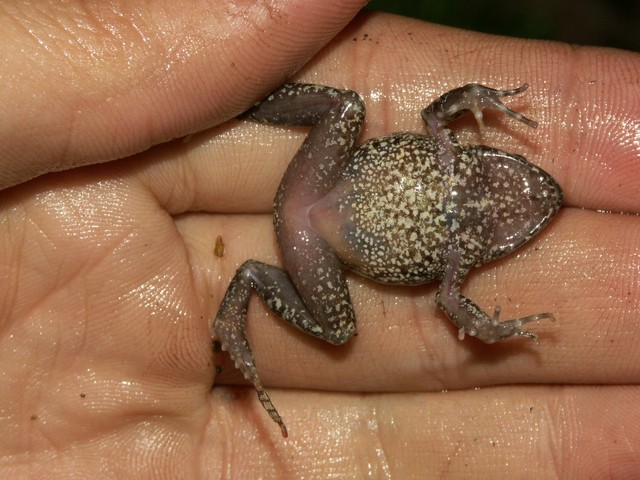
Ventral view

== Description ==
Adult males measure 22–24 mm (0.9–0.9 in) and adult females 24–29 mm (0.9–1.1 in) in snout–vent length. The body is robust and the limbs are stout. The snout is triangular in dorsal view and blunt in lateral view. The tympanum is visible but not distinct. The fingers and the toes are stout with rounded and swollen tips. No webbing is present. Skin is glandular and wrinkled in the posterior surface of the venter but otherwise just slightly tuberculate. Dorsal colouration ranges from pale to medium brown with small, dark brown to almost black markings. A pale cream mid-dorsal stripe is present in some individuals. Ventral surfaces of the throat and body are grey to white with dark brown markings. The iris is golden with black vermiculations.

== Habitat and conservation ==
Arthroleptis palava occurs in various human-modified landscapes, including eucalyptus plantations and farmland, and in grazed grasslands, at elevations of 1,000–1,900 m (3,300–6,200 ft) above sea level. Development is believed to be direct (i.e., there is no free-living larval stage), as in related species.

There are no threats to this species that is associated with human-altered environments and has a relatively wide distribution.
