= Arthroleptis kutogundua =

Conservation status
- Critically endangered, possibly extinct (IUCN 3.1)

Scientific classification
- Kingdom: Animalia
- Phylum: Chordata
- Class: Amphibia
- Order: Anura
- Family: Arthroleptidae
- Genus: Arthroleptis
- Species: A. kutogundua

Binomial name
- Arthroleptis kutogundua Blackburn, 2012

Species of amphibian

Arthroleptis kutogundua, also known as the overlooked squeaker frog, is a species of frog in the family Arthroleptidae. It has not been seen since 1930, and is believed to be possibly extinct.

== Taxonomy ==
Originally, Arthroleptis kutogundua was incorrectly identified as Arthroleptis adolfifriederici. It was formally described as a new species in 2012 by David C. Blackburn. He gave it the specific epithet 'kutogundua' from a Kiswahili word for 'to not discover', referring to the fact that its original collector did not recognize it as a new species.

== Description ==
Arthroleptis kutogundua is larger than most members of its genus, with the only known specimen being 44.4mm long. They have longer toes and less prominent tympanums than other members of their genus as well.

== Habitat and distribution ==
Arthroleptis kutogundua is only known from its type locality, Ngozi Crater in the Poronto Mountains of Tanzania. The holotype was collected while hopping on the sodden forest floor, and the species is believed to be terrestrial and associated with leaf litter.

== History ==
The holotype and only known specimen of Arthroleptis kutogundua was an adult female, collected on March 19, 1930, by herpetologist Arthur Loveridge. He incorrectly identified it as Arthroleptis adolfifriederici. The species has not been seen since then. In 2012, herpetologist David Blackburn reassessed the specimen, and identified it as a new species. His recommendation was that the species be classed as Data Deficient by the IUCN. The IUCN assessed the species on October 1, 2012, and classified it as Critically Endangered and possibly extinct.

== Scientific Challenges and Unknowns ==
According to Blackburn(2012), No DNA analysis has been completed on the arthroleptis kutogundua because only one holotype exists, making its evolutionary relationship to other arthroleptis species unknown. The holotype has undergone significant degradation othertime which makes it very difficult for future comparisons to be made. Many amphibians species tend to go unrecorded for decades due to a lack of spotting and inaccessibility, this species despite being found in a spot with many biodiversity surveys in the region no other specimens were found which makes the disappearance of them highly unusual. It is believed that this species may have been super sensitive to climate change, which means that the changes in temperature could have affected its survival. The poroto mountains are a very little studied amphibian hotspot which means more undiscovered species may even exist over there.
