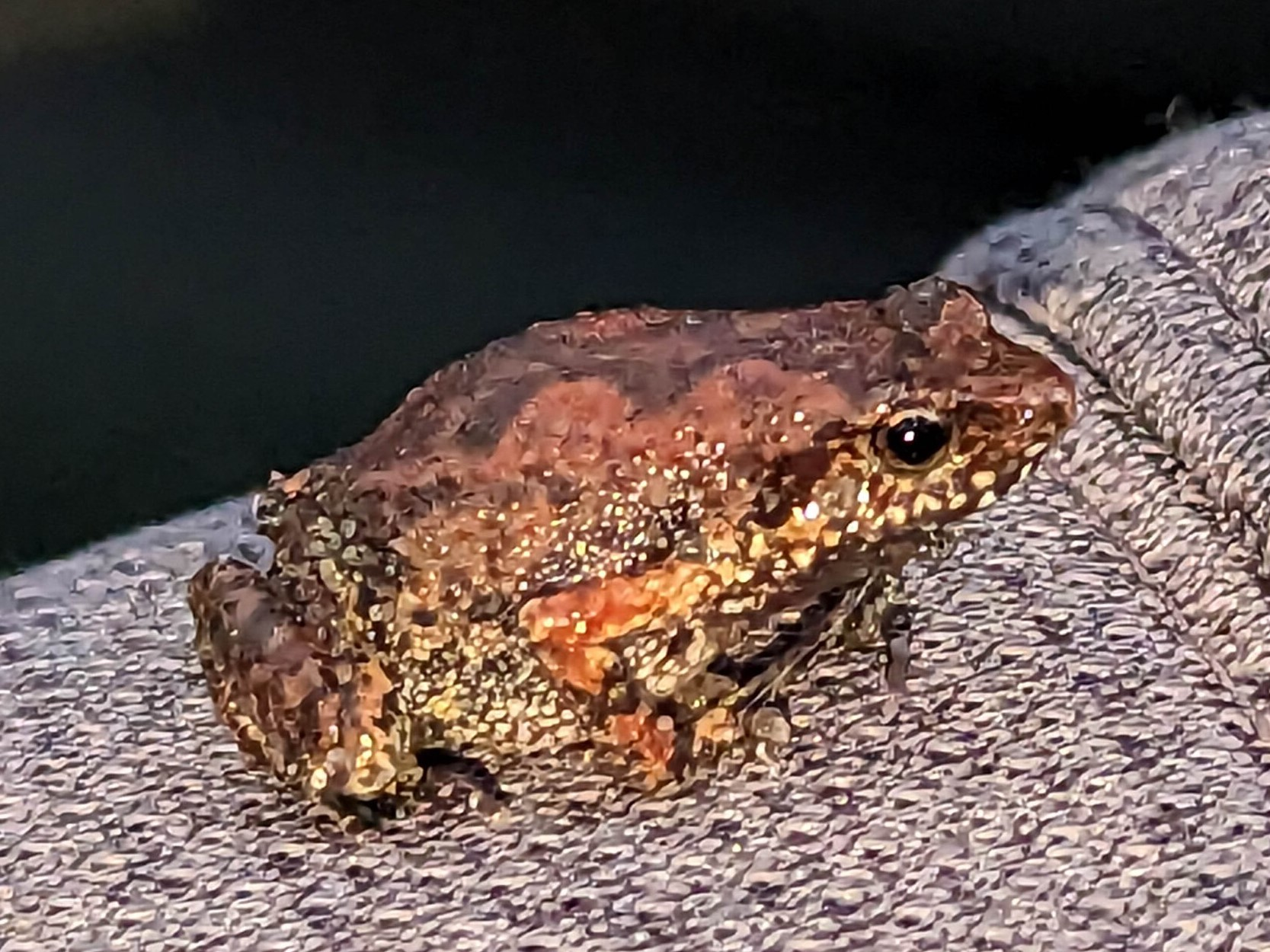

Conservation status
- Least Concern (IUCN 3.1)

Scientific classification
- Kingdom: Animalia
- Phylum: Chordata
- Class: Amphibia
- Order: Anura
- Family: Arthroleptidae
- Genus: Arthroleptis
- Species: A. lameerei

Binomial name
- Arthroleptis lameerei de Witte, 1921

Synonyms
- Schoutedenella muta de Witte, 1933; Schoutedenella lameeri (de Witte, 1933)

= Arthroleptis lameerei =

Species of frog

Arthroleptis lameerei is a species of frog in the family Arthroleptidae. It is found in northeastern Angola, southeastern Democratic Republic of the Congo, and western Burundi, though the exact range is poorly known. There is some doubt whether it is distinct from Arthroleptis xenochirus. The specific name lameerei honours Auguste Lameere, a Belgian entomologist. Common names Lameere's squeaker, Lameer's squeaker, and Katanga screeching frog have been coined for this species.

== Description ==
Arthroleptis lameerei is a small, stocky species that can grow to 23 mm (0.9 in) in snout–vent length. The snout is truncated. The tympanum is distinct. The fingers are moderately long and simply obtuse. The toes are rather short and simply obtuse, with rudimentary, basal webbing. Dorsal skin is granular whereas the ventral surfaces are smooth. The dorsum is dark brown, spotted or mottled with black. A darker double-hourglass pattern and/or a thin, light vertebral line may be present. The limbs have black crossbars or spotting. Mature males have a single vocal sac.

== Habitat and conservation ==
Arthroleptis lameerei is a leaf-litter species that presumably occurs in savanna woodlands and forests. Development is direct (i.e., no free-living larval stage). It is very common in parts of its range. There are no known major threats to this species. It occurs in the Upemba National Park in southern Democratic Republic of Congo, and probably also in other protected areas.
