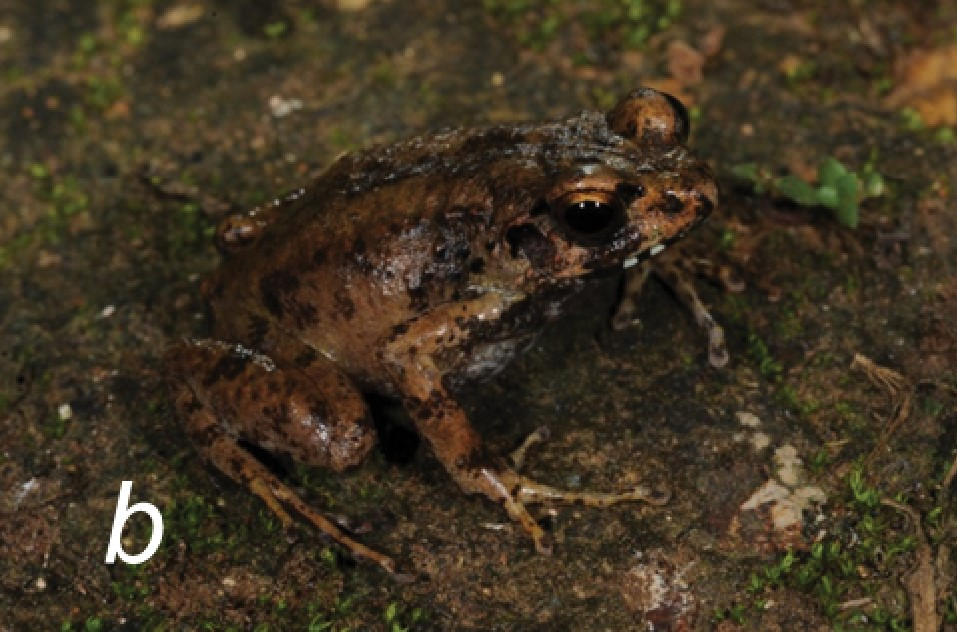

Conservation status
- Data Deficient (IUCN 3.1)

Scientific classification
- Kingdom: Animalia
- Phylum: Chordata
- Class: Amphibia
- Order: Anura
- Family: Arthroleptidae
- Genus: Arthroleptis
- Species: A. carquejai

Binomial name
- Arthroleptis carquejai Ferreira, 1906

= Arthroleptis carquejai =

Species of frog

Arthroleptis carquejai is a species of frog in the family Arthroleptidae. It is known with certainty only from north-western Angola, but there is also a recent record from Gabon. If this is correct, its distribution might also include intervening areas in the Republic of the Congo and the Democratic Republic of the Congo. The specific name carquejai honours Bento Carqueja, Portuguese professor, journalist, and philanthropist. The common names Cambondo screeching frog and Carqueja's squeaker have been proposed for it.

== Description ==
The holotype is a female measuring 28 mm (1.1 in) in snout–vent length. The holotype has gular and anterior venter areas that are darkly pigmented with pale spots, distinguishing this species from otherwise quite similar Arthroleptis variabilis (which has a prominent and well-defined mid-gular stripe in females and juveniles, and generally uniformly pigmented gular region of males). Two unsexed specimens about 135 kilometres north from the type locality measure 20–30 mm (0.8–1.2 in) in snout–vent length and show traces of a pale mid-gular line.

== Habitat and conservation ==
There is no direct information on habitat and ecology of this species, but it is likely to be a terrestrial frog inhabiting lowland forest, and possibly other habitats. It probably has direct development (i.e, there is no free-living larval stage), like other Arthroleptis.

Threats to this species are unknown, and it is not known to occur in any protected areas.
