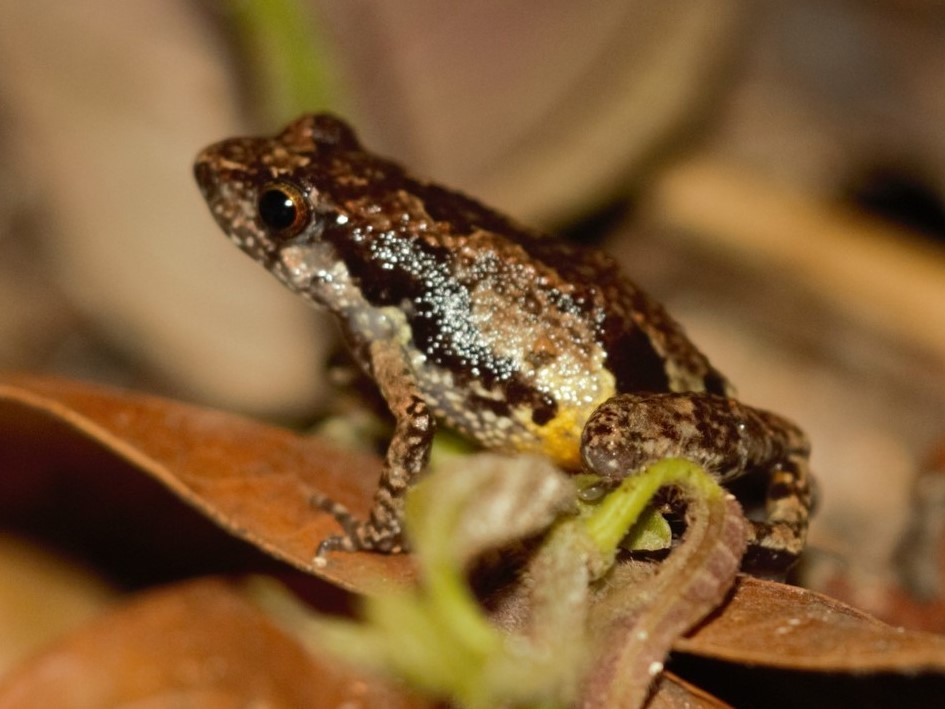

Conservation status
- Least Concern (IUCN 3.1)

Scientific classification
- Kingdom: Animalia
- Phylum: Chordata
- Class: Amphibia
- Order: Anura
- Family: Arthroleptidae
- Genus: Arthroleptis
- Species: A. sylvaticus

Binomial name
- Arthroleptis sylvaticus Laurent, 1954

Synonyms
- Arthroleptis sylvatica Laurent, 1954

= Arthroleptis sylvaticus =

Species of frog

Arthroleptis sylvaticus is a species of frog in the family Arthroleptidae. It is found in Cameroon, Central African Republic, Republic of the Congo, Democratic Republic of the Congo, and Gabon, and possibly Equatorial Guinea and Nigeria. Its natural habitat is subtropical or tropical moist lowland forests. It is threatened by habitat loss.
