= Arthroleptis spinalis =

Conservation status
- Data Deficient (IUCN 3.1)

Scientific classification
- Kingdom: Animalia
- Phylum: Chordata
- Class: Amphibia
- Order: Anura
- Family: Arthroleptidae
- Genus: Arthroleptis
- Species: A. spinalis

Binomial name
- Arthroleptis spinalis Boulenger, 1919

Species of amphibian

Arthroleptis spinalis, the Tanganyika screeching frog, is a species of frog in the family Arthroleptidae. It is endemic to the western shore of Lake Tanganyika in the Democratic Republic of the Congo.
