= Arthroleptis tuberosus =

Conservation status
- Data Deficient (IUCN 3.1)

Scientific classification
- Kingdom: Animalia
- Phylum: Chordata
- Class: Amphibia
- Order: Anura
- Family: Arthroleptidae
- Genus: Arthroleptis
- Species: A. tuberosus

Binomial name
- Arthroleptis tuberosus Andersson, 1905

Synonyms
- Arthroleptis variabilis var. tuberosa Andersson, 1905; Arthroleptis procterae De Witte, 1921

Species of frog

Arthroleptis tuberosus is a species of frog in the family Arthroleptidae. It is found in Cameroon, Gabon, Republic of the Congo, and eastern Democratic Republic of the Congo, possibly Central African Republic. Its natural habitats are montane and (presumably) lowland forests. It is threatened by habitat loss for agriculture and logging but is protected by the Virunga National Park and possibly other protected areas.
