= Arthroleptis nikeae =

Conservation status
- Critically Endangered (IUCN 3.1)

Scientific classification
- Kingdom: Animalia
- Phylum: Chordata
- Class: Amphibia
- Order: Anura
- Family: Arthroleptidae
- Genus: Arthroleptis
- Species: A. nikeae

Binomial name
- Arthroleptis nikeae Poynton, 2003

Species of amphibian

Arthroleptis nikeae, also known as Nike's squeaker, is a species of frogs in the family Arthroleptidae. It is endemic to the Mafwemiro Reserve in the Rubeho Mountains of Tanzania. It was named after conservationist Nike Doggart, who first found it. With a maximum snout–vent length of 57 mm (2.2 in), it is among the largest Arthroleptis species.

== Description ==
Females grow to a snout–vent length 57 mm (2.2 in). The dorsum is brown with a dark inter-orbital bar and two dark chevrons. The limbs have dark crossbars. The fingers and the toes have expanded discs. The tympanum is distinct but small, about half of the eye diameter.

== Habitat and conservation ==
Arthroleptis nikeae can be found in leaf litter in previously degraded montane forest at elevations of 1,800–2,000 m (5,900–6,600 ft) above sea level. While it occurs in a forest reserve, the area is not well protected and forest loss is occurring there. The species has not been found in other nearby forests, and it appears that its maximum extent of occurrence is no more than 3.3 square kilometres (1.3 sq mi).
