= Arthroleptis nlonakoensis =

Conservation status
- Endangered (IUCN 3.1)

Scientific classification
- Kingdom: Animalia
- Phylum: Chordata
- Class: Amphibia
- Order: Anura
- Family: Arthroleptidae
- Genus: Arthroleptis
- Species: A. nlonakoensis

Binomial name
- Arthroleptis nlonakoensis (Plath, Herrmann, and Böhme, 2006)

Synonyms
- Phrynobatrachus nlonakoensis Plath, Herrmann, and Böhme

Species of frog

Arthroleptis nlonakoensis is a species of frog in the family Arthroleptidae. It is endemic to southwestern Cameroon and known from its type locality, the eponymous Mount Nlonako, and from two other locations in southwestern Cameroon (Ebo Forest and Ekom-Nkam). Common name Nlonako squeaker has been proposed for it.

== Description ==
Adult males measure 15–22 mm (0.6–0.9 in) and adult females 14–20 mm (0.6–0.8 in) in snout–vent length. The snout round in profile and convex in dorsal view. The tympanum is distinct. The fingers have terminal discs and well-defined subarticular tubercles but no webbing. The toes have rudimentary webbing, terminal discs, and less well developed subarticular tubercles. Skin is smooth. Dorsal colouration is olive green-brownish. The head is dark brown to blackish. There is a white interorbital band that varies from continuous and straight to interrupted or slightly v-shaped, even reduced to a rudimentary spot. There are white spots on the lips, flanks, and forelegs. The venter and the inner side of the legs are beige to yellowish white. Males have dark brown throat.

== Habitat and conservation ==
Arthroleptis nlonakoensis occurs in lowland and submontane secondary rain forest (Mount Nlonako) and in primary rain forest (Ebo Forest). It occurs at about 450 m (1,480 ft) above sea level. Individuals have been found in leaf litter and perching in low vegetation. Development is believed to be direct (i.e., there is no free-living larval stage), as in related species.

Arthroleptis nlonakoensis is threatened by habitat loss and degradation caused by agricultural activities, expanding human settlements, and logging.
