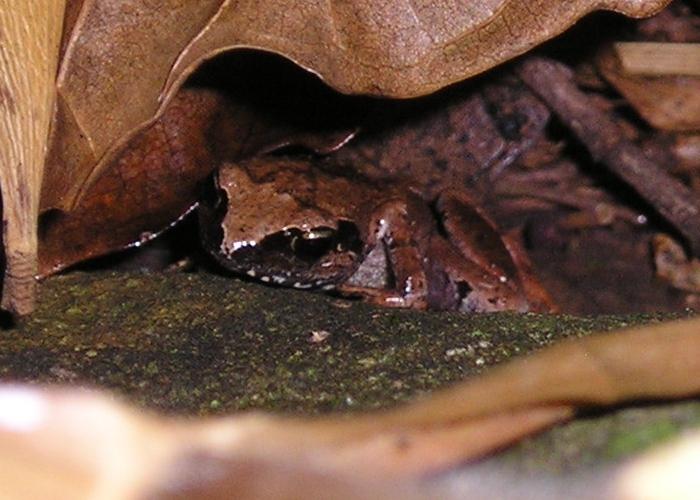

Conservation status
- Least Concern (IUCN 3.1)

Scientific classification
- Kingdom: Animalia
- Phylum: Chordata
- Class: Amphibia
- Order: Anura
- Family: Arthroleptidae
- Genus: Arthroleptis
- Species: A. wahlbergii

Binomial name
- Arthroleptis wahlbergii Smith, 1849

= Bush squeaker =

Species of frog

The bush squeaker (Arthroleptis wahlbergii) is a species of frog in the family Arthroleptidae. It is found along the coastal areas of eastern South Africa and possibly Mozambique.

== Habitat ==
Its natural habitats are subtropical or tropical dry forests, subtropical or tropical moist shrubland, plantations, rural gardens, urban areas, and heavily degraded former forest, where it is found mostly in leaf-litter and rotting vegetation.

== Biology and habits ==
The eggs are laid in damp leaf-litter where the young hatch as miniature frogs. The call is a high-pitched squeak, usually emitted during wet weather, which is often mistaken for the calls of crickets.

It is threatened by habitat loss.
