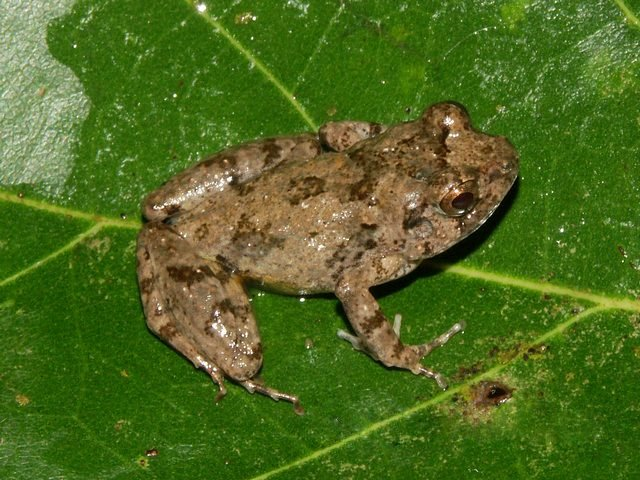

Conservation status
- Least Concern (IUCN 3.1)

Scientific classification
- Kingdom: Animalia
- Phylum: Chordata
- Class: Amphibia
- Order: Anura
- Family: Arthroleptidae
- Genus: Arthroleptis
- Species: A. adelphus

Binomial name
- Arthroleptis adelphus Perret, 1966

= Arthroleptis adelphus =

Species of frog

Arthroleptis adelphus is a species of frog in the family Arthroleptidae found in the western equatorial region of Africa in southern Cameroon, Equatorial Guinea (including Bioko), and Gabon, and possibly in southwestern Central African Republic and northwestern Republic of the Congo.

Arthroleptis adelphus occurs in lowland forests where it lives in leaf-litter on the forest floor. It avoids marshy areas. It is a common species that occurs in several protected areas. It can be negatively impacted by forest loss for agriculture, wood, and human settlement.
