= Arthroleptis brevipes =

Conservation status
- Data Deficient (IUCN 3.1)

Scientific classification
- Kingdom: Animalia
- Phylum: Chordata
- Class: Amphibia
- Order: Anura
- Family: Arthroleptidae
- Genus: Arthroleptis
- Species: A. brevipes

Binomial name
- Arthroleptis brevipes Ahl, 1924

Species of frog

Arthroleptis brevipes is a species of frog in the family Arthroleptidae. It is found in Togo and possibly Ghana. Its natural habitats are subtropical or tropical moist lowland forests and heavily degraded former forest.
