= Arthroleptis loveridgei =

Conservation status
- Data Deficient (IUCN 3.1)

Scientific classification
- Kingdom: Animalia
- Phylum: Chordata
- Class: Amphibia
- Order: Anura
- Family: Arthroleptidae
- Genus: Arthroleptis
- Species: A. loveridgei

Binomial name
- Arthroleptis loveridgei de Witte, 1933

Synonyms
- Schoutedenella loveridgei (de Witte, 1933)

Species of amphibian

Arthroleptis loveridgei is a species of frogs in the family Arthroleptidae. It is endemic to Democratic Republic of the Congo and only known from its type locality, "Arebi (Uelé)", Ituri Province, in the northeastern part of the country. The specific name loveridgei honours Arthur Loveridge, an American herpetologist. Common names Loveridge's screeching frog and Loveridge's squeaking frog have been coined for it.

== Taxonomy ==
Arthroleptis loveridgei was described in 1933 by Gaston-François de Witte based on two specimens collected in 1925. In 1954, Raymond Laurent placed it in the genus Schoutedenella de Witte, 1921, but the genus has not been recognized in later research. The identity of this taxon needs clarification.

== Habitat and conservation ==
Ecology and conservation status of this species are unknown, and the IUCN SSC Amphibian Specialist Group considers it as "data deficient".
