= Arthroleptis hematogaster =

Conservation status
- Data Deficient (IUCN 3.1)

Scientific classification
- Kingdom: Animalia
- Phylum: Chordata
- Class: Amphibia
- Order: Anura
- Family: Arthroleptidae
- Genus: Arthroleptis
- Species: A. hematogaster

Binomial name
- Arthroleptis hematogaster (Laurent, 1954)

Synonyms
- Schoutedenella hematogaster Laurent, 1954

Species of frog

Arthroleptis hematogaster is a species of frog in the family Arthroleptidae. It is endemic to the Itombwe and Kabobo highlands in the eastern Democratic Republic of the Congo. This little known species is believed to live in montane forests at elevations of about 2,350–2,400 m (7,710–7,870 ft) above sea level.
