= Arthroleptis pyrrhoscelis =

Conservation status
- Least Concern (IUCN 3.1)

Scientific classification
- Kingdom: Animalia
- Phylum: Chordata
- Class: Amphibia
- Order: Anura
- Family: Arthroleptidae
- Genus: Arthroleptis
- Species: A. pyrrhoscelis

Binomial name
- Arthroleptis pyrrhoscelis Laurent, 1952

Synonyms
- Schoutedenella pyrrhoscelis (Laurent, 1952)

Species of frog

Arthroleptis pyrrhoscelis is a species of frog in the family Arthroleptidae. It is endemic to the Itombwe and Kabobo highlands in the eastern Democratic Republic of the Congo. Its natural habitat is montane grassland. It is supposedly a common species.
