= Arthroleptis aureoli =

Conservation status
- Near Threatened (IUCN 3.1)

Scientific classification
- Kingdom: Animalia
- Phylum: Chordata
- Class: Amphibia
- Order: Anura
- Family: Arthroleptidae
- Genus: Arthroleptis
- Species: A. aureoli

Binomial name
- Arthroleptis aureoli (Schiøtz, 1964)

Synonyms
- Cardioglossa aureoli Schiøtz, 1964

Species of frog

Arthroleptis aureoli, also known as the Freetown long-fingered frog or Mount Aureol squeaker, is a species of frog in the family Arthroleptidae. It is found in the Freetown Peninsula, Sierra Leone (the region of its type locality), and in northern Sierra Leone and into the adjacent Guinea.

== Habitat and conservation ==
Arthroleptis aureoli occurs in forests, plantations, and rural gardens near forests at elevations below 400 m (1,300 ft). It lives on rocks, often near streams and rivers. Development is direct (i.e., there is no free-living larval stage).

This species is believed to be declining because of ongoing declines in the extent and quality of its habitat. The habitat is threatened by the expansion of human settlements, small-scale agriculture and grazing activities, artisanal gold mining, wildfires, and even hydroelectric dams. It is present in the Western Area Peninsula Forest National Park, and its range might extend into the Loma Mountains National Park, both in Sierra Leone.
