= Arthroleptis vercammeni =

Conservation status
- Data Deficient (IUCN 3.1)

Scientific classification
- Kingdom: Animalia
- Phylum: Chordata
- Class: Amphibia
- Order: Anura
- Family: Arthroleptidae
- Genus: Arthroleptis
- Species: A. vercammeni

Binomial name
- Arthroleptis vercammeni (Laurent, 1954)

Synonyms
- Schoutedenella vercammeni Laurent, 1954

Species of frog

Arthroleptis vercammeni, also known as the Mwana screeching frog or Vercammen's squeaker, is a species of frog in the family Arthroleptidae. It is endemic to eastern Democratic Republic of the Congo and is only known from its type locality at Mwana in Mwenga Territory, South Kivu province. The specific name vercammeni honours Paul-Henry Vercammen-Grandjean, entomologist and virologist from France/Belgium.

== Description ==
Males grow to a snout–vent length of 15 mm (0.59 in) and females to 17 mm (0.67 in). The dorsum is brown with a distinctive pattern while the underside is orange. The flanks are mottled grey. Males have black throat and orange-red thighs; females have grey throat. The finger and the toe tips are expanded. The male advertisement call is unknown.

== Habitat and conservation ==
Arthroleptis vercammeni occurs in leaf litter in forest. The type locality is at 1,650 m (5,410 ft) above sea level. There is no recent information on ecology or abundance of this species, and the International Union for Conservation of Nature (IUCN) considers it "data deficient". It is not known to occur in any protected area.
