= Arthroleptis xenodactylus =

Conservation status
- Endangered (IUCN 3.1)

Scientific classification
- Kingdom: Animalia
- Phylum: Chordata
- Class: Amphibia
- Order: Anura
- Family: Arthroleptidae
- Genus: Arthroleptis
- Species: A. xenodactylus

Binomial name
- Arthroleptis xenodactylus Boulenger, 1909

Species of frog

Arthroleptis xenodactylus (common names: Amani screeching frog, eastern squeaker) is a species of frog in the family Arthroleptidae. It is endemic to eastern Tanzania. Its natural habitats are lowland and montane forests where it occurs in leaf-litter, under logs, and in the axils of banana leaves. It is a locally common species that is threatened by habitat loss.
