= Arthroleptis reichei =

Conservation status
- Least Concern (IUCN 3.1)

Scientific classification
- Kingdom: Animalia
- Phylum: Chordata
- Class: Amphibia
- Order: Anura
- Family: Arthroleptidae
- Genus: Arthroleptis
- Species: A. reichei

Binomial name
- Arthroleptis reichei Nieden, 1911

Species of frog

Arthroleptis reichei is a species of frog in the family Arthroleptidae. It is found in the mountains of eastern and southern Tanzania and northern Malawi. It has several vernacular names: Poroto screeching frog, large-toad squeaker, Poroto Mountains screeching frog, and Reiche's squeaker. The specific name reichei honours Karl Friedrich Reiche, a German botanist.

== Description ==
A. reichei is a small Arthroleptis species: adult males measure 21–28 mm (0.8–1.1 in) and adult females 21–32 mm (0.8–1.3 in) in snout–vent length. The head is narrow and the legs are long. The tympanum is small and is oval in shape. The finger and the toe tips are expanded. The dorsum is brown, usually with a darker hourglass pattern and a pale line or triangle between the eyes.

The male advertisement call consists of irregular repetition of a single whistling note, with a duration of up 30 seconds and consisting of maximally 64 notes. The note repetition rate is about 2.3 per second. There is a dominant frequency at about 3400–3500 Hz.

== Habitat and conservation ==
Arthroleptis reichei occurs in montane forests at elevations of 1,500–2,200 m (4,900–7,200 ft) above sea level. It is a leaf-litter species living on the forest floor. Males call from low shrubs and in wild banana plants. As other members of the genus, it probably breeds by direct development (i.e., there is no free-living larval stage).

It is relatively abundant within its known range, but is threatened by habitat loss caused by agricultural activities, small-scale wood extraction, and expanding human settlements. It is known to occur in several protected areas.
