= Cave squeaker =

Conservation status
- Critically endangered, possibly extinct (IUCN 3.1)

Scientific classification
- Kingdom: Animalia
- Phylum: Chordata
- Class: Amphibia
- Order: Anura
- Family: Arthroleptidae
- Genus: Arthroleptis
- Species: A. troglodytes

Binomial name
- Arthroleptis troglodytes Poynton, 1963

Species of frog

The cave squeaker (Arthroleptis troglodytes) is a species of frog in the family Arthroleptidae. It is endemic to the Chimanimani Mountains in Zimbabwe.

Its natural habitats are subtropical or tropical, high-altitude grassland and caves. Very little is known about this species save that it is taxonomically distinct from "true frogs" from the family Ranidae. The cave squeaker undergoes direct development, forgoing existence as a tadpole and hatching directly as miniature adults. The embryo develops into a tadpole and subsequently into an adult frog before hatching. The eggs must still be laid in a damp location, however. This ability frees the cave squeaker from dependence on bodies of water for reproduction.

This is a small species, measuring just 25 mm (0.98 in) in total length. The tips of the fingers and toes are slightly swollen. The colouration of the dorsal surface is light brown with slightly dark speckling on the back of the head, with the remainder of the back being dark brown with irregular dark markings. The arms and legs are strongly banded.

The cave squeaker is listed as critically endangered in the IUCN Red List of Threatened Species because its extent of occurrence is less than 100 km^{2} and its area of occupancy is less than 10 km^{2}, all individuals are in a single location, and a continuing decline in the number of mature individuals may occur, due to climate change (or other unidentified threats).

== First sighting in more than 50 years ==
In February 2017 scientists from the Natural History Museum of Zimbabwe in Bulawayo announced they had located and captured four specimens of the frog the previous December, the first such occurrence since 1962. The discovery took place near Chimanimani, in a mountainous area in eastern Zimbabwe. Researchers planned to breed the frogs and later release some in the wild to help the species grow.
