= Arthroleptis anotis =

Conservation status
- Critically Endangered (IUCN 3.1)

Scientific classification
- Kingdom: Animalia
- Phylum: Chordata
- Class: Amphibia
- Order: Anura
- Family: Arthroleptidae
- Genus: Arthroleptis
- Species: A. anotis

Binomial name
- Arthroleptis anotis Loader, Poynton, Lawson, Blackburn & Menegon, 2011

Species of frog

The earless squeaker (Arthroleptis anotis) is a species of the genus Arthroleptis. It is endemic to Tanzania. They live in habitats such as forests in elevations up to 1,900 m (6,200 ft). It was scientifically described in 2011.
