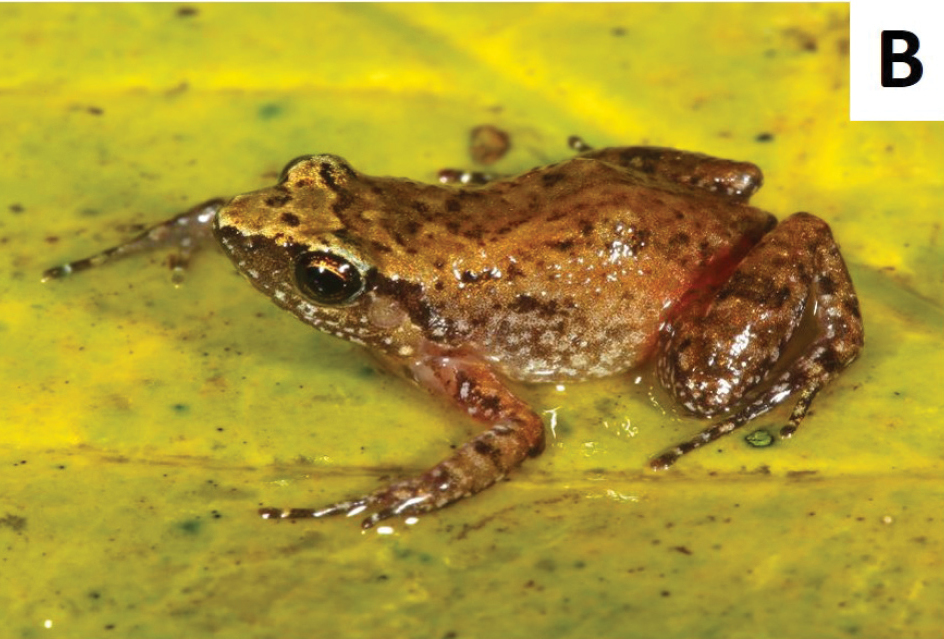

Conservation status
- Least Concern (IUCN 3.1)

Scientific classification
- Kingdom: Animalia
- Phylum: Chordata
- Class: Amphibia
- Order: Anura
- Family: Arthroleptidae
- Genus: Arthroleptis
- Species: A. xenodactyloides

Binomial name
- Arthroleptis xenodactyloides Hewitt, 1933

= Dwarf squeaker =

Species of frog

Arthroleptis xenodactyloides, also known as the dwarf squeaker or Chirinda screeching frog (and other names), is a species of frog in the family Arthroleptidae. It is found in eastern highlands of Zimbabwe and Malawi, central Mozambique, and eastern Zambia northwards to northeastern Tanzania and the Taita Hills of Kenya; it probably occurs in adjacent Democratic Republic of the Congo. Its natural habitats are lowland and montane forests, dense woodlands, grasslands, and swamps. It is locally threatened by habitat loss.
