= Arthroleptis mossoensis =

Conservation status
- Data Deficient (IUCN 3.1)

Scientific classification
- Kingdom: Animalia
- Phylum: Chordata
- Class: Amphibia
- Order: Anura
- Family: Arthroleptidae
- Genus: Arthroleptis
- Species: A. mossoensis

Binomial name
- Arthroleptis mossoensis (Laurent, 1954)

Synonyms
- Schoutedenella mossoensis Laurent, 1954

Species of amphibian

Arthroleptis mossoensis, the Mosso screeching frog, is a species of frog in the family Arthroleptidae. It is endemic to Burundi and only known from its type locality near Mosso in Rutana Province, at an elevation of 1,200 m (3,900 ft) above sea level.
