= Arthroleptis bioko =

Conservation status
- Endangered (IUCN 3.1)

Scientific classification
- Kingdom: Animalia
- Phylum: Chordata
- Class: Amphibia
- Order: Anura
- Family: Arthroleptidae
- Genus: Arthroleptis
- Species: A. bioko

Binomial name
- Arthroleptis bioko Blackburn, 2010

Species of frog

Arthroleptis bioko, the Bioko squeaker frog, is a species of frog from the genus Arthroleptis. It is native to Equatorial Guinea. The species was scientifically described in 2010 by Blackburn. It is listed as Endangered on the IUCN Red List.

== Description ==
The species is a medium-sized frog with a relatively thin head. The eyes have a spherical pupil and protrude somewhat from the eyelids on the sides of the head. On the sides of their bodies, they have skin ridges, and on the back and sides of their bodies, they have little, spiky projections. The species is entirely described from male specimens measuring between 26.7 to 33.4 mm (1.05 to 1.31 in). The third digit on the front limbs, which have four digits total, is the longest. The fourth finger on the hind limbs, which have five digits total, is the longest. The toes and fingers have broad, rounded tips, and there is no webbing between the digits. The species is generally grayish-brown in color. The dorsal side of the frog has a few distinct deeper brown markings and blotchy areas of light-brownish gray. The tympanum is dark and hardly translucent. There is no colour on the tips of the fingers and toes. In addition to having a longer third finger, males also have spiny projections on their toes and crotch. They also have stretched and darker-colored skin around their throats. Both the pupil and iris are gray.

== Distribution and habitat ==
The species is endemic to Equatorial Guinea in about one to four locations. They are found in elevations around 1,321 to 1,820 m (4,334 to 5,971 ft). They are listed as Endangered on the IUCN based on their declining population, though much is not known in that regard. Climate change could be another reason for the decline in populations.

== Ecology and behavior ==
It lives in forests of Bioko in leaf litters. They are also spotted near water sources like streams. Not much is known about the disturbance tolerance of the species or its secondary habitat. Human encroachment could be a possible threat to the species rather than habitat loss.
