= Arthroleptis phrynoides =

Conservation status
- Data Deficient (IUCN 3.1)

Scientific classification
- Kingdom: Animalia
- Phylum: Chordata
- Class: Amphibia
- Order: Anura
- Family: Arthroleptidae
- Genus: Arthroleptis
- Species: A. phrynoides

Binomial name
- Arthroleptis phrynoides (Laurent, 1976)

Species of amphibian

Arthroleptis phrynoides, the Lomami screeching frog, is a species of frog in the family Arthroleptidae. It is endemic to Democratic Republic of the Congo and is known only from the type locality at Lomami near Lomela Territory.
