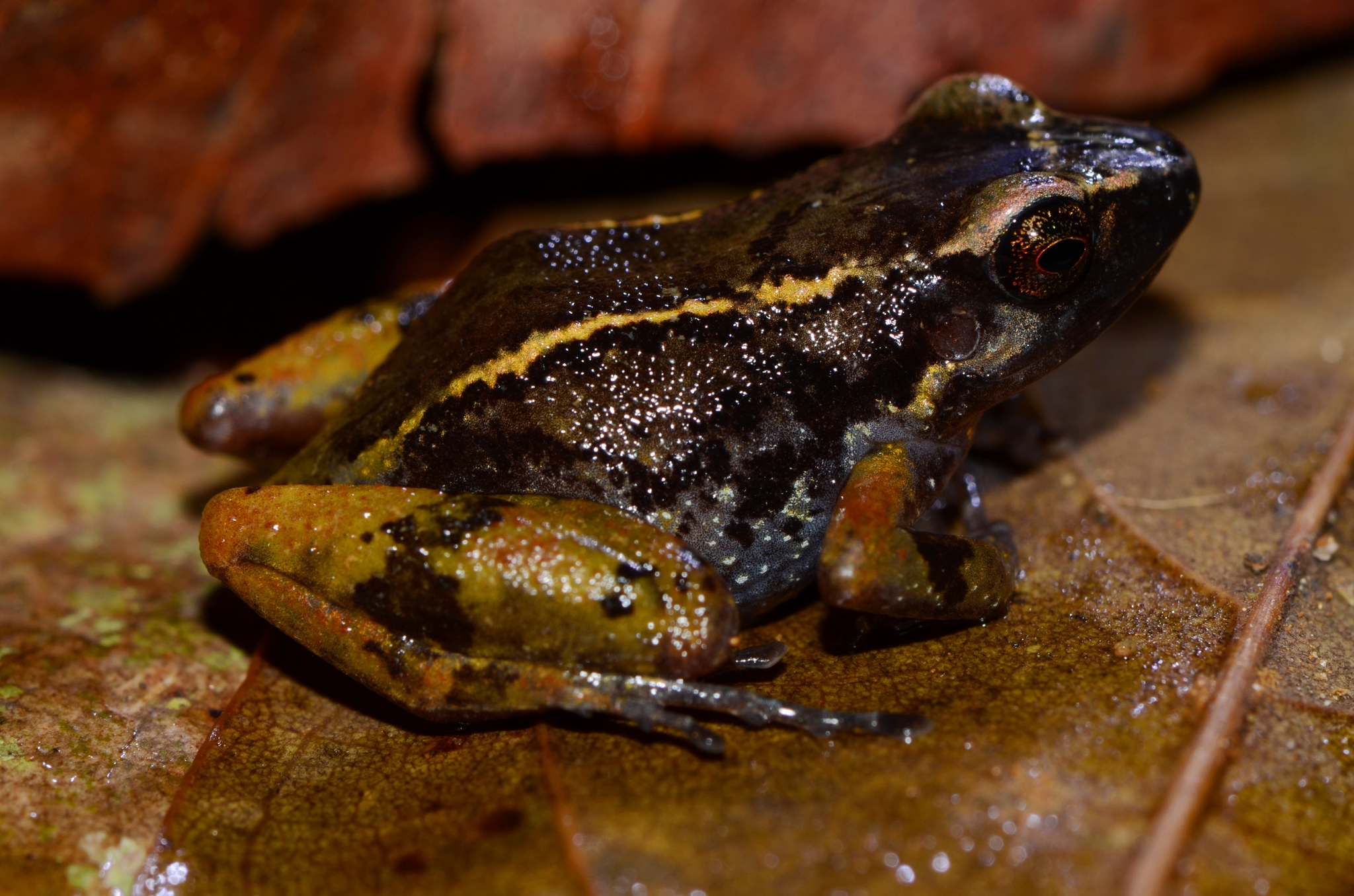

Conservation status
- Least Concern (IUCN 3.1)

Scientific classification
- Kingdom: Animalia
- Phylum: Chordata
- Class: Amphibia
- Order: Anura
- Family: Arthroleptidae
- Genus: Arthroleptis
- Species: A. taeniatus

Binomial name
- Arthroleptis taeniatus Boulenger, 1906

Synonyms
- Schoutedenella taeniata (Boulenger, 1906)

= Arthroleptis taeniatus =

Species of frog

Arthroleptis taeniatus is a species of frog in the family Arthroleptidae. It is found in southern Cameroon, south-western Central African Republic, Equatorial Guinea (including Bioko), Gabon, western Democratic Republic of the Congo, and probably the Republic of the Congo. Its natural habitats are shallow marshes in forest. It can be locally threatened by habitat loss. It is common in parts of its range (i.e., Cameroon).
