= Mount Nimba screeching frog =

Conservation status
- Data Deficient (IUCN 3.1)

Scientific classification
- Kingdom: Animalia
- Phylum: Chordata
- Class: Amphibia
- Order: Anura
- Family: Arthroleptidae
- Genus: Arthroleptis
- Species: A. nimbaensis

Binomial name
- Arthroleptis nimbaensis Angel, 1950

Synonyms
- Schoutedenella nimbaensis (Angel, 1950)

Species of amphibian

The Mount Nimba screeching frog (Arthroleptis nimbaensis) is a species of frog in the family Arthroleptidae. It is endemic to Mount Richard-Molard (Mount Nimba) in Guinea, from forests at elevations of 650 to 1,250 m. It is threatened by habitat degradation from mining activities.
