= Auguste Lameere =

Belgian entomologist (1864–1942)

- In 1898
- Born: 12 June 1864; Ixelles, Belgium
- Died: 6 May 1942 (aged 77)

Academic work
- Discipline: entomology
- Institutions: Université libre de Bruxelles
- Main interests: Coleoptera
- Notable works: Manuel de la Faune de Belgique

Auguste Alfred Lucien Gaston Lameere (12 June 1864 – 6 May 1942) was a Belgian entomologist. He made several collecting expeditions to the Algerian Sahara region.

He was born in Ixelles. He was a professor and dean (1906–1907) of the faculty of sciences at the Université libre de Bruxelles. An active member of the Royal Belgian Entomological Society, he was the author of numerous articles, notably on Coleoptera and the famous Manuel de la Faune de Belgique which had a great influence on the entomologists of his country.

Frog Arthroleptis lameerei, also known as Lameere's squeaker, is named after him.

== Works ==
Partial list

- 1902. Revision des Prionides (Quatrième mémoire – Sténodontines)Annalles de la Société Entomologique de Belgique 9: 63-110.
- 1903. Révision des Prionides (Sixième mémoire – Basitoxus). Annales de la Société Entomologique de Belgique 47: 213-224.
- 1912. Révision des prionides (Vingt-deuxième mémoire – Addenda et Corrigenda)Mémoires de la Société Entomologique de Belgique 21: 113-188.
- 1913. Coleopterorum Catalogus, pars. 52, Cerambycidae. Prioninae. Berlin, W. Junk, 108 p.
- 1919. Genera Insectorum, Coleoptera, Fam. Cerambycidae, Subfam. Prioninae.Bruxelles, P. Wytsman, v. 172, 189 p

== See also ==
- Category:Taxa named by Auguste Lameere
