= Arthroleptis bivittatus =

Conservation status
- Data Deficient (IUCN 3.1)

Scientific classification
- Kingdom: Animalia
- Phylum: Chordata
- Class: Amphibia
- Order: Anura
- Family: Arthroleptidae
- Genus: Arthroleptis
- Species: A. bivittatus

Binomial name
- Arthroleptis bivittatus Müller, 1885

Synonyms
- Schoutedenella bivittata (Müller, 1885)

Species of frog

Arthroleptis bivittatus is a species of frog in the family Arthroleptidae. It is endemic to Guinea and only known from the holotype collected from the Tombo Island. It is uncertain whether this species is distinct from the common Arthroleptis poecilonotus. Common name Tumbo-Insel screeching frog has been coined for this species.

== Description ==
The holotype, an adult female, measures 26 mm (1.0 in) in snout–vent length. The overall appearance is stocky. The tympanum is small (diameter 1.5 mm). Inter-digital webbing is absent. The long-preserved specimen is brown in colour. There are traces of a darker mid-dorsal pattern that could be similar to the hourglass pattern in Arthroleptis poecilonotus. Diffuse, lighter dorsolateral bands are visible.

== Habitat and conservation ==
Not much is known about this species that has not been observed after it was described more than 100 years ago. It is assumed to inhabit lowland forest. Threats to it are unknown.
