= Arthroleptis zimmeri =

Conservation status
- Data Deficient (IUCN 3.1)

Scientific classification
- Kingdom: Animalia
- Phylum: Chordata
- Class: Amphibia
- Order: Anura
- Family: Arthroleptidae
- Genus: Arthroleptis
- Species: A. zimmeri

Binomial name
- Arthroleptis zimmeri (Ahl, 1925)

Synonyms
- Pararthroleptis zimmeri Ahl, 1925 "1923"; Schoutedenella zimmeri (Ahl, 1925)

Species of amphibian

Arthroleptis zimmeri, also known as Zimmer's screeching frog, is a species of frog in the family Arthroleptidae. It is endemic to Ghana, and is known only from its type locality in Accra. The specific name zimmeri honours Carl Wilhelm Erich Zimmer, a German zoologist.
