= Nyctibates =

Conservation status
- Least Concern (IUCN 3.1)

Scientific classification
- Kingdom: Animalia
- Phylum: Chordata
- Class: Amphibia
- Order: Anura
- Family: Arthroleptidae
- Genus: Nyctibates; Boulenger, 1904
- Species: N. corrugatus

Binomial name
- Nyctibates corrugatus Boulenger, 1904

Genus of amphibians

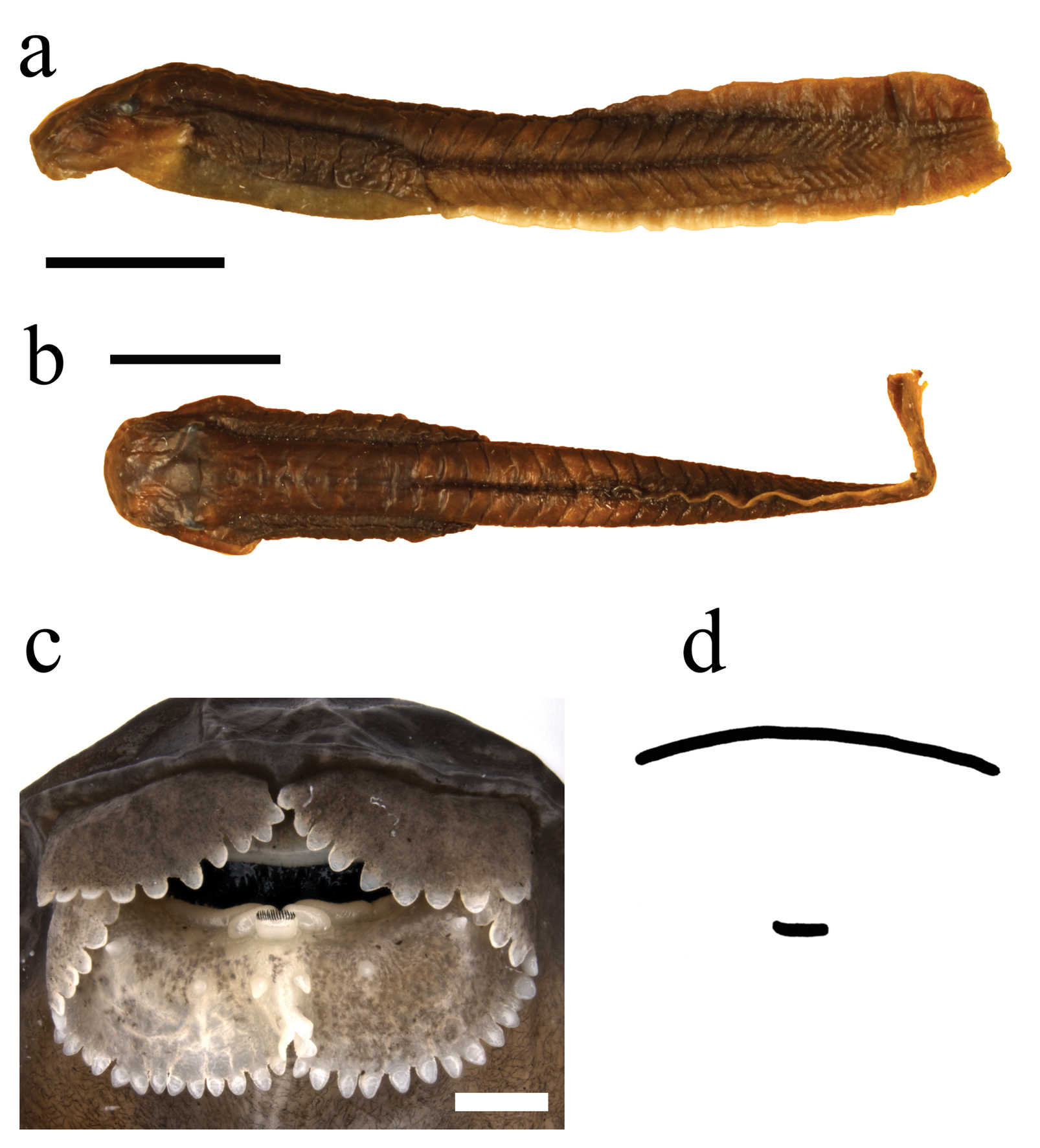
Figure 16; Nyctibates corrugatus tadpole (ZMB 82112, Gosner stage 25); a lateral, and b dorsal view; c oral disc; d keratodont arrangement; the downward bent head (a) is a preservation artifact; black bars = 1 cm, white bar = 1 mm.

Nyctibates is a monotypic genus of frog in the family Arthroleptidae; its sole species is Nyctibates corrugatus. Found in Cameroon, Equatorial Guinea, and Nigeria, its natural habitats are lowland forests in hilly areas, typically forests that have humid, but not marshy, floors; it requires tall forests with closed canopy. Breeding takes place in fast, rocky streams with clean water. There are no significant threats to this species.
