= Claw =

Curved, pointed appendage at the end of a digit of a mammal, bird, or reptile

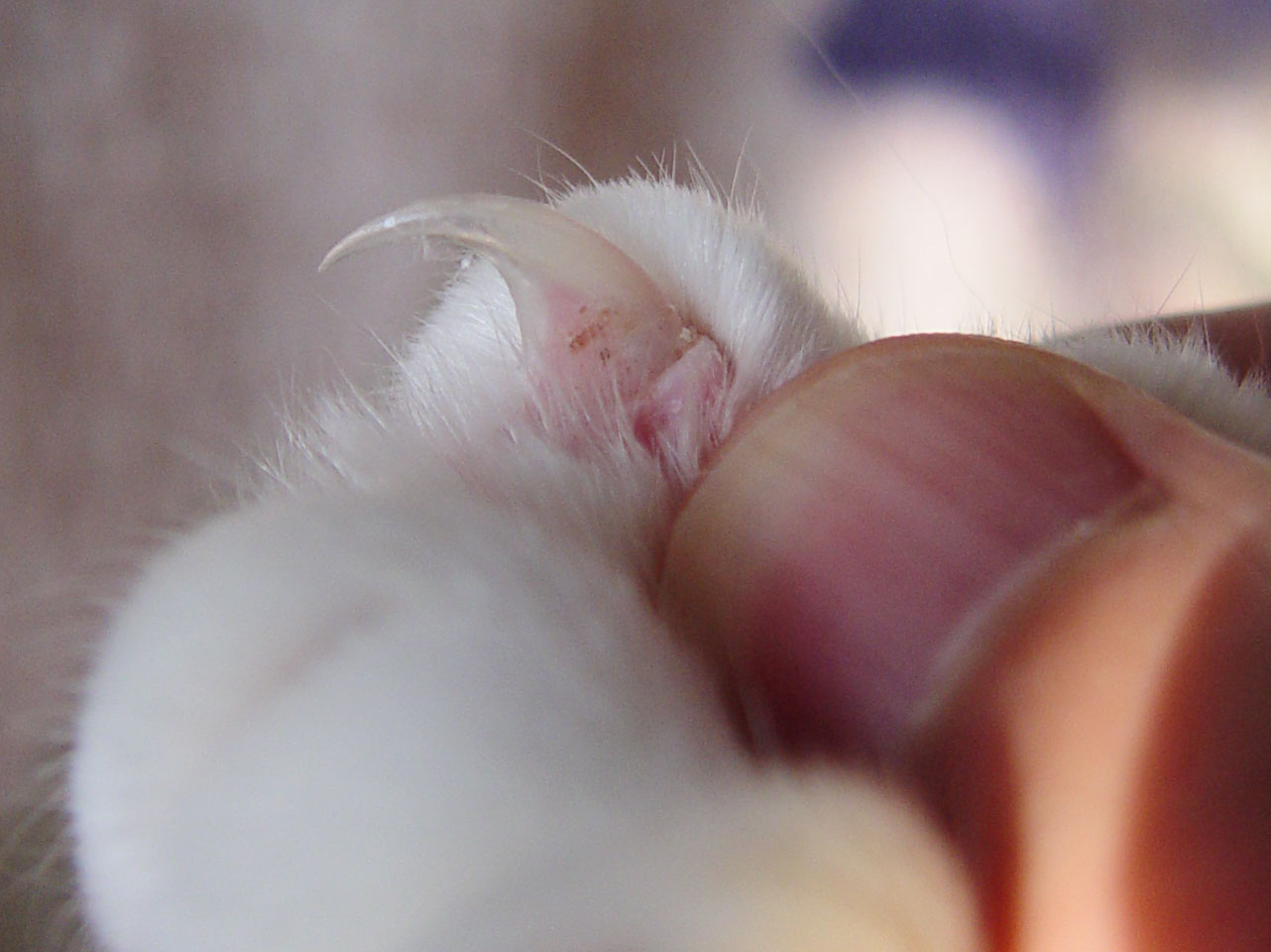
A domestic cat's retractable claw in protracted position

A claw is a curved, pointed appendage found at the end of a toe or finger in most amniotes (mammals, reptiles, birds). Some invertebrates such as beetles, spiders, and velvet worms have somewhat similar fine, hooked structures at the end of the leg or tarsus for gripping a surface as they walk. The pincers of crabs, lobsters, crayfish, shrimps, prawns and scorpions, more formally known as their chelae, are sometimes called claws.

A true claw is made of a hard protein called keratin. Claws are used to catch and hold prey in carnivorous mammals such as cats and dogs, but may also be used for such purposes as digging, climbing trees, self-defense and grooming, in those and other species.

Similar appendages that are flat and do not come to a sharp point are called nails instead. Claw-like projections that do not form at the end of digits but spring from other parts of the foot are properly named spurs.

== Tetrapods ==
In tetrapods, claws are made of keratin and consist of two layers. The unguis is the harder external layer, which consists of keratin fibers arranged perpendicular to the direction of growth and in layers at an oblique angle. The subunguis is the softer, flaky underside layer whose grain is parallel to the direction of growth. The claw grows outward from the nail matrix at the base of the unguis and the subunguis grows thicker while travelling across the nail bed. The unguis grows outward faster than the subunguis to produce a curve and the thinner sides of the claw wear away faster than their thicker middle, producing a more or less sharp point. Tetrapods use their claws in many ways, commonly to grasp or kill prey, to dig and to climb and hang.

=== Mammals ===
A little egret using its talons to hold on to a power line and move down the line.

All carnivorans have claws, which vary considerably in length and shape. Claws grow out of the third phalanges of the paws and are made of keratin. Many predatory mammals have protractile claws that can partially hide inside the animal's paw, especially the cat family, Felidae, almost all of whose members have fully protractible claws. Protractible or retractible claws are also found in Viverridae, the extinct Nimravidae and Thylacoleonidae, Eupleridae, the foxes of Urocyon, Blanford's fox, and the Red Panda. A claw that is retractable is protected from wear and tear.

Most cats and dogs also have a dewclaw on the inside of the front paws. It is much less functional than the other claws but does help the cats to grasp prey. Because the dew claw does not touch the ground, it receives less wear and tends to be sharper and longer.

A nail is homologous to a claw but is flatter and has a curved edge instead of a point. A nail that is big enough to bear weight is called a "hoof". (Nevertheless, one side of the cloven-hoof of artiodactyl ungulates may also be called a claw).

Every so often, the growth of claws stops and restarts, as does hair. In a hair, this results in the hair falling out and being replaced by a new one. In claws, this results in an abscission layer, and the old segment breaks off. This process takes several months for human thumbnails. Cats are often seen working old unguis layers off on wood or on boards made for the purpose. Ungulates' hooves wear or self-trim by ground contact. Domesticated equids (horses, donkeys and mules) usually need regular trimming as a consequence of reduced activity on hard ground.

==== Primates ====
Primate nails consist of the unguis alone, as the subunguis has disappeared. With the evolution of grasping hands and feet, claws are no longer necessary for locomotion, and instead most digits exhibit nails. However, claw-like nails are found in small-bodied callitrichids on all digits except the hallux or big toe. A laterally flattened grooming claw, used for grooming, can be found on the second toe in living strepsirrhines, and the second and third in tarsiers. Aye-ayes have functional claws on all other digits except the hallux, including a grooming claw on the second toe. Less commonly known, a grooming claw is also found on the second pedal digit of night monkeys (Aotus), titis (Callicebus), and possibly other New World monkeys.

=== Reptiles ===
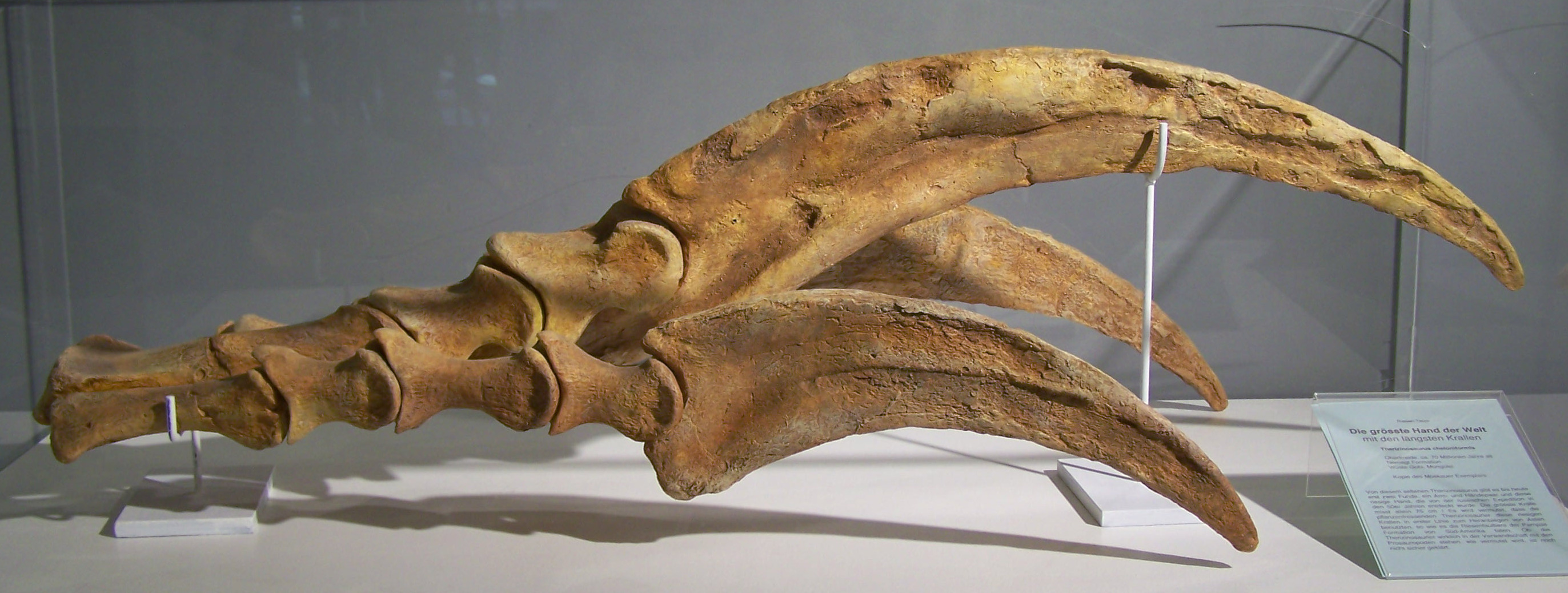
At just under a meter, the claws of Therizinosaurus are among the largest recorded.

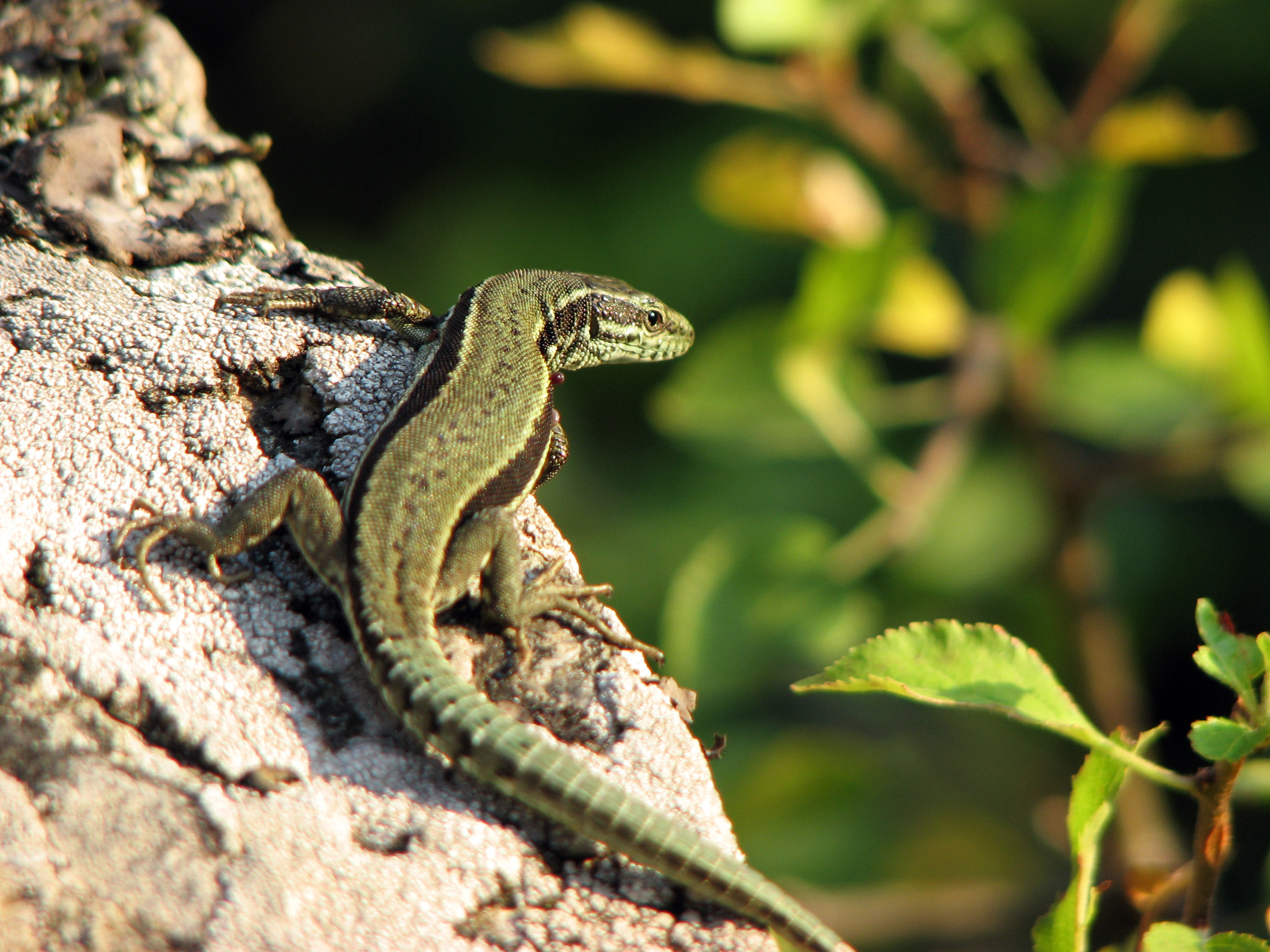
Using its claws for anchoring, a green lizard basks.

Most reptiles have well-developed claws. Most lizards have toes ending in stout claws. In snakes, feet and claws are absent, but in many boids such as Boa constrictor, remnants of highly reduced hind-limbs emerge with a single claw as "spurs" on each side of the anal opening.

Lizard claws are used as aids in climbing, and in holding down prey in carnivorous species.

=== Birds ===
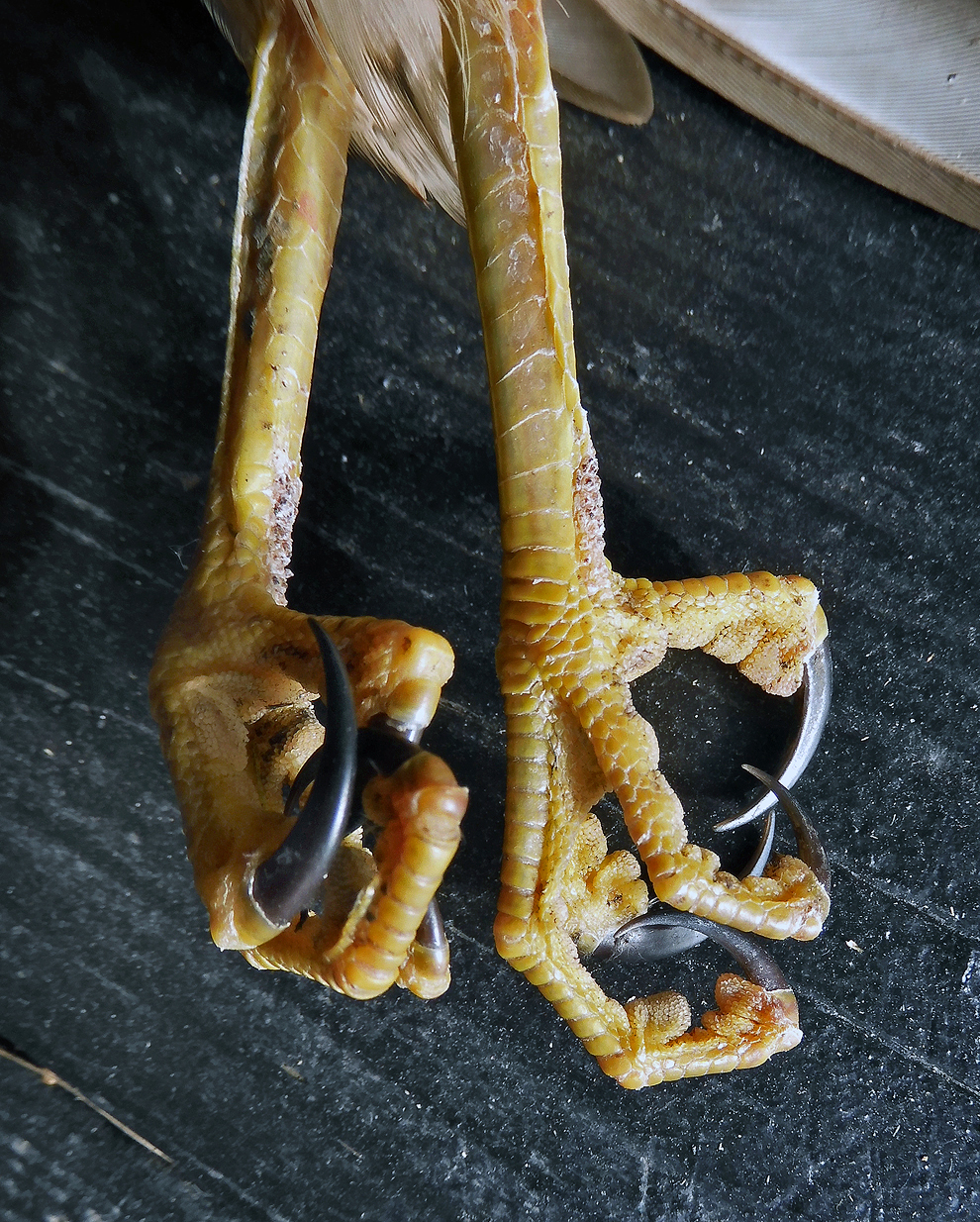
Claws of Eurasian sparrowhawk.

A talon is the claw of a bird of prey, its primary hunting tool. The talons are very important; without them, most birds of prey would not be able to catch their food. Some birds also use claws for defensive purposes. Cassowaries use claws on their inner toe (digit I) for defence and have been known to disembowel people. All birds, however, have claws, which are used as general holdfasts and protection for the tip of the digits.

The hoatzin and turaco are unique among extant birds in having functional claws on the thumb and index finger (digits I and II) on the forelimbs as chicks, allowing them to climb trees until the adult plumage with flight feathers develop. However, several birds have a claw- or nail-like structure hidden under the feathers at the end of the hand digits, notably ostriches, emus, ducks, geese and kiwis.

=== Amphibians ===
The only amphibians to bear claws are the African clawed frogs. Claws evolved separately in the amphibian and amniote (reptiliomorph) line. However, the hairy frog has claw analogues on its feet; the frog intentionally dislocates the tips of its fingers to unsheathe the sharp points of its last phalanges.

== Arthropods ==
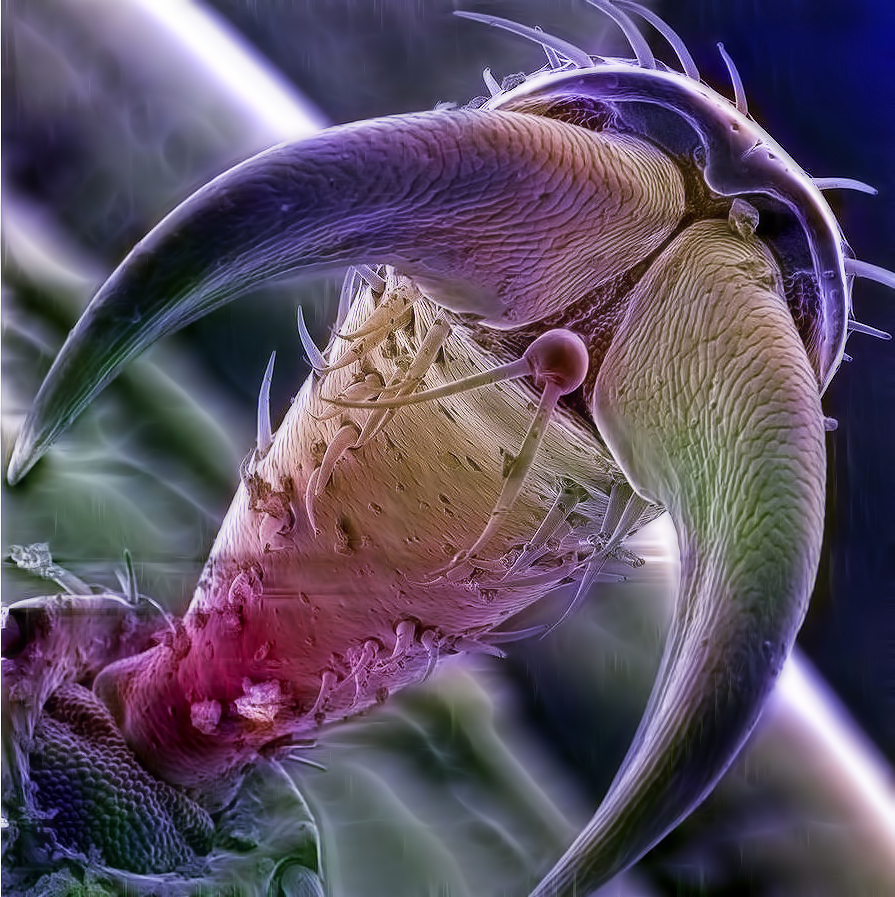
A beetle's chelae under a scanning electron microscope

The scientifically correct term for the "claw" of an arthropod, such as a lobster or crab, is a chela (plural chelae). Legs bearing a chela are called chelipeds. Chelae are also called pincers.

== See also ==
- Horse hoof
- Dactyly
