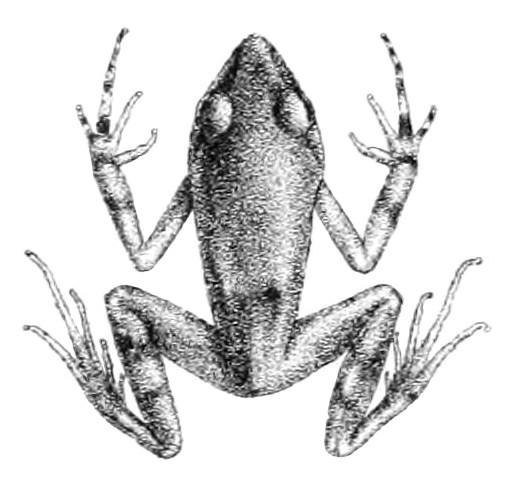

Conservation status
- Least Concern (IUCN 3.1)

Scientific classification
- Kingdom: Animalia
- Phylum: Chordata
- Class: Amphibia
- Order: Anura
- Family: Arthroleptidae
- Genus: Arthroleptis
- Species: A. poecilonotus

Binomial name
- Arthroleptis poecilonotus Peters, 1863

Synonyms
- Arthroleptis macrodactylus Boulenger, 1882; Arthroleptis inguinalis Boulenger, 1900

= Arthroleptis poecilonotus =

Species of frog

Arthroleptis poecilonotus (common names: West African screeching frog, mottled squeaker) is a species of frog in the family Arthroleptidae. This adaptable species has a wide range within the Sub-Saharan Africa and is not considered threatened.

== Distribution and taxonomy ==
Arthroleptis poecilonotus is widely distributed in the West African forest belt from Guinea-Bissau to Gabon, north-central Central African Republic, the Republic of the Congo, northern Democratic Republic of the Congo and extreme western Uganda, possibly as far as South Sudan. It is also present on Bioko. The IUCN SSC Amphibian Specialist Group lists the following countries: Benin, Cameroon, Republic of the Congo, Democratic Republic of the Congo, Ivory Coast, Equatorial Guinea, Gabon, Ghana, Guinea, Guinea-Bissau, Liberia, Nigeria, Uganda, South Sudan, and Togo. There are no records from Sierra Leone, although the species is likely to be present there. The taxonomic status of the nominal species is problematic, with one species (or more) representing western parts of its range, and another one in the eastern parts. Arthroleptis bivittatus and Arthroleptis zimmeri are possibly junior synonyms of this species.

== Description ==
Males measure 20–26 mm (0.8–1.0 in) and females 21–29 mm (0.8–1.1 in) in snout–vent length.

== Habitat ==
Arthroleptis poecilonotus inhabits secondary herbaceous growth in the forest zone. It also occurs in clearings and along forest tracks, and in towns and villages.

== Ecology ==
Arthroleptis poecilonotus breeds away from water-bodies, laying its eggs on the ground where the developing larvae undergo direct development into juvenile frogs.

== Status ==
Arthroleptis poecilonotus is a common species facing no particular threats. It has a wide distribution and is presumed to have a large total population. It is present in some protected areas, and the International Union for Conservation of Nature has assessed its conservation status as "least concern".
