= Arthroleptis crusculum =

Conservation status
- Near Threatened (IUCN 3.1)

Scientific classification
- Kingdom: Animalia
- Phylum: Chordata
- Class: Amphibia
- Order: Anura
- Family: Arthroleptidae
- Genus: Arthroleptis
- Species: A. crusculum

Binomial name
- Arthroleptis crusculum Angel, 1950

Synonyms
- Schoutedenella crusculum (Angel, 1950)

Species of frog

Arthroleptis crusculum is a species of frog in the family Arthroleptidae. It is found in southern Guinea, Liberia, Sierra Leone, and Côte d'Ivoire, at elevations of 500–1,750 m (1,640–5,740 ft) above sea level.

Its natural habitats are high-altitude grassland, gallery forests, and the edges of marshes. It is threatened by habitat loss caused by mining, agriculture, and livestock farming.
