= Arthroleptis adolfifriederici =

Conservation status
- Least Concern (IUCN 3.1)

Scientific classification
- Kingdom: Animalia
- Phylum: Chordata
- Class: Amphibia
- Order: Anura
- Family: Arthroleptidae
- Genus: Arthroleptis
- Species: A. adolfifriederici

Binomial name
- Arthroleptis adolfifriederici Nieden, 1911

Synonyms
- Arthroleptis adolfi-friederici Nieden, 1911 "1910"

Species of frog

Arthroleptis adolfifriederici is a species of frog in the family Arthroleptidae. It is found in the eastern Democratic Republic of the Congo, Rwanda, Burundi, and Uganda. Several common names have been coined for it, including Rugege Forest squeaker, Rugegewald squeaker, Adolf Friedrich's squeaker frog, and Adolf's squeaker.

== Etymology ==
The specific name adolfifriederici is named for Duke Adolf Friedrich of Mecklenburg, German explorer and colonial politician, based on the "stately form" of the species.

== Description ==
Arthroleptis adolfifriederici is a moderately robust frog with long, slender limbs. Males measure 28–32 mm (1.1–1.3 in) (two specimens only) and females 30–43 mm (1.2–1.7 in) in snout–vent length. The head is broad. The tympanum is distinct and circular, tending toward ovoid. The fingers and toes do not have webbing but the toes have prominent subarticular tubercles. Skin is generally glandular. Color in preservative (alcohol) is light to medium brown with small, dark-brown spots.

== Habitat and conservation ==
It can be found in leaf litter of montane forests (including bamboo forests) at elevations of 1,780–2,815 m (5,840–9,236 ft) above sea level. It has also been recorded at the edge of human-modified forests following land clearance for agriculture. It appears to be an uncommon species. It is threatened by forest loss due to agriculture, timber cutting, and human settlements. It occurs in many protected areas, including the Nyungwe Forest National Park in Rwanda and Bwindi Impenetrable Forest in Uganda.
