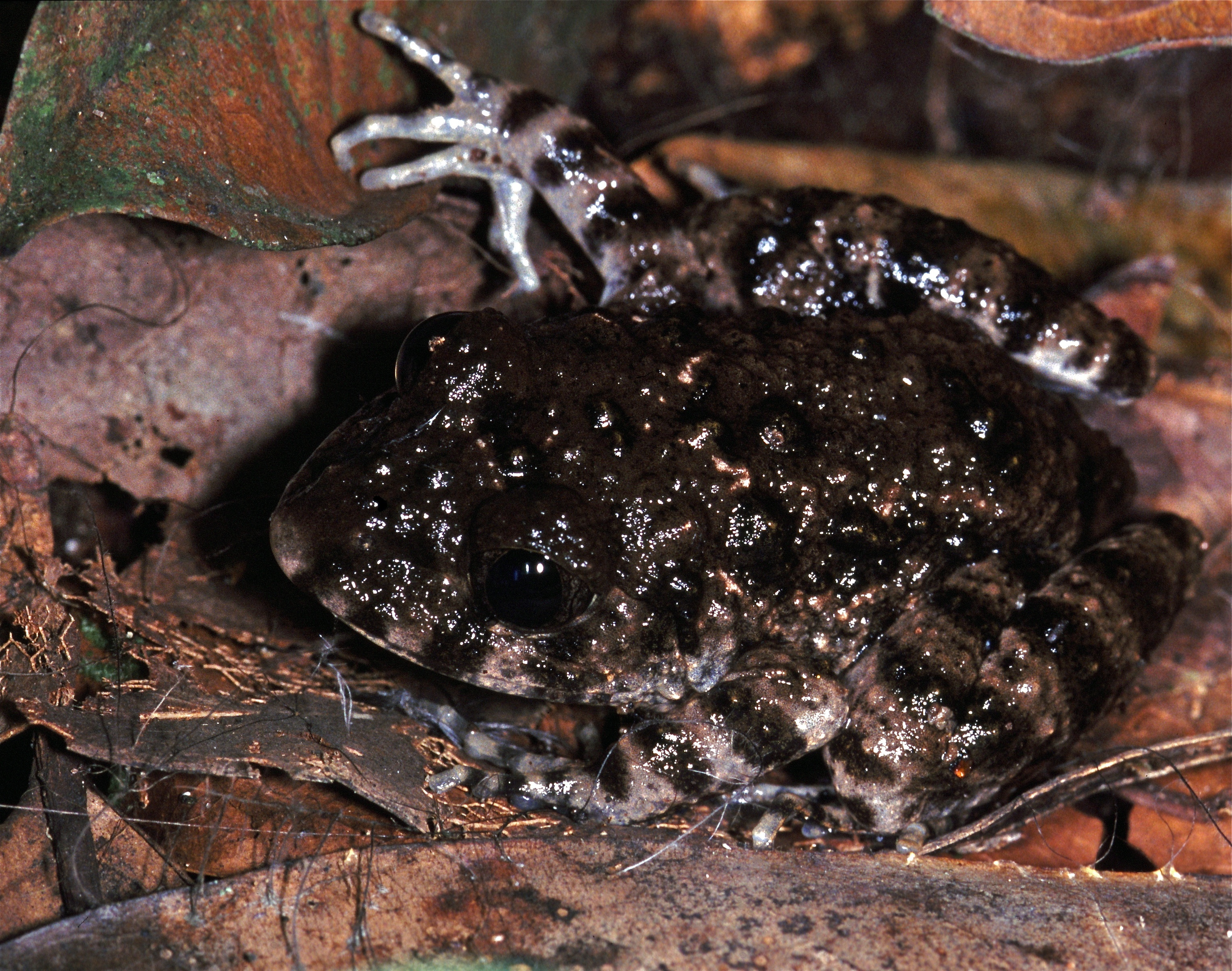

Conservation status
- Least Concern (IUCN 3.1)

Scientific classification
- Kingdom: Animalia
- Phylum: Chordata
- Class: Amphibia
- Order: Anura
- Family: Arthroleptidae
- Genus: Scotobleps; Boulenger, 1900
- Species: S. gabonicus

Binomial name
- Scotobleps gabonicus Boulenger, 1900

Synonyms
- Astylosternus gabonicus (Boulenger, 1900); Astylosternus oxyrhynchus Nieden, 1908; Scotobleps camerunensis Ahl, 1927 "1925"

= Scotobleps =

Genus of amphibians

Scotobleps is a monotypic frog genus in the family Arthroleptidae; its sole species is Scotobleps gabonicus, sometimes known as the Gaboon forest frog or Gabon forest frog. It is found in eastern Nigeria, western and southwestern Cameroon, Equatorial Guinea, western Gabon, western Republic of the Congo, and western Democratic Republic of the Congo. Its range could extend into the Cabinda Enclave of Angola.

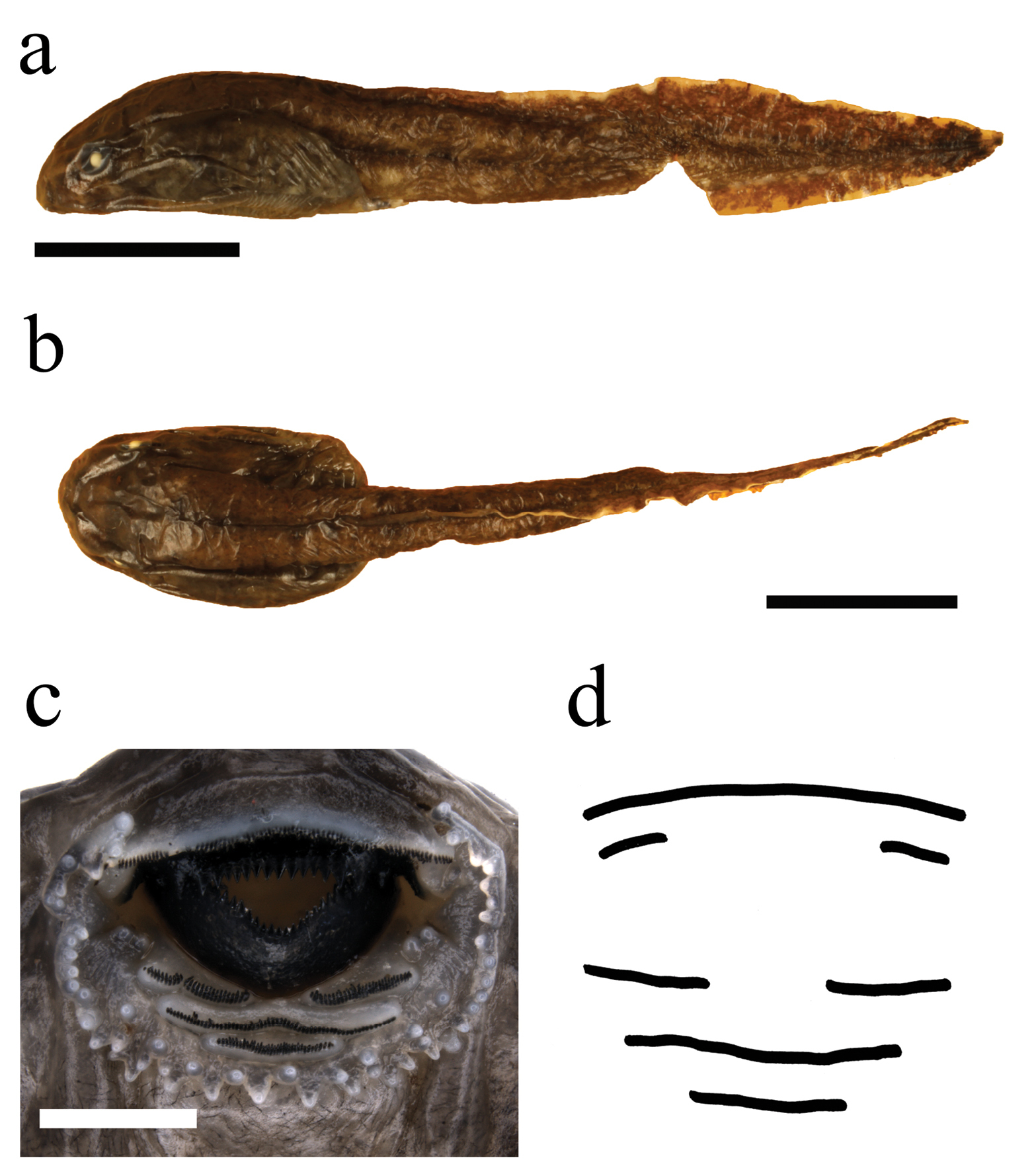
Scotobleps gabonicus tadpole

== Description ==
Males grow to 52 mm (2.0 in) and females to 70 mm (2.8 in) in snout–vent length. The syntype(s) measured 57 mm (2.2 in) in snout–vent length. The head is rather large, as long as broad. The snout is obtusely pointed with a feeble canthus rostralis. The eyes are large. The fingers and toes are moderately elongated, with slightly swollen tips and very strong subarticular tubercles. The toes are half-webbed. Skin is smooth or with small flat warts on the back. The dorsum is olive-brown with small, blackish spots. There is a dark cross-band between the eyes and the upper lip has blackish vertical bars; the one below the anterior third of the eye is extending onto the lower lip. Limbs have dark cross-bars. The venter is white.

== Habitat and conservation ==
Scotobleps gabonicus is a common species at low altitudes, living in lowland rainforests, including secondary forests. Breeding takes place in flowing water, preferably in wide, shallow streams with sandy banks but also in torrents. Loss of its forest habitat is causing population declines.
