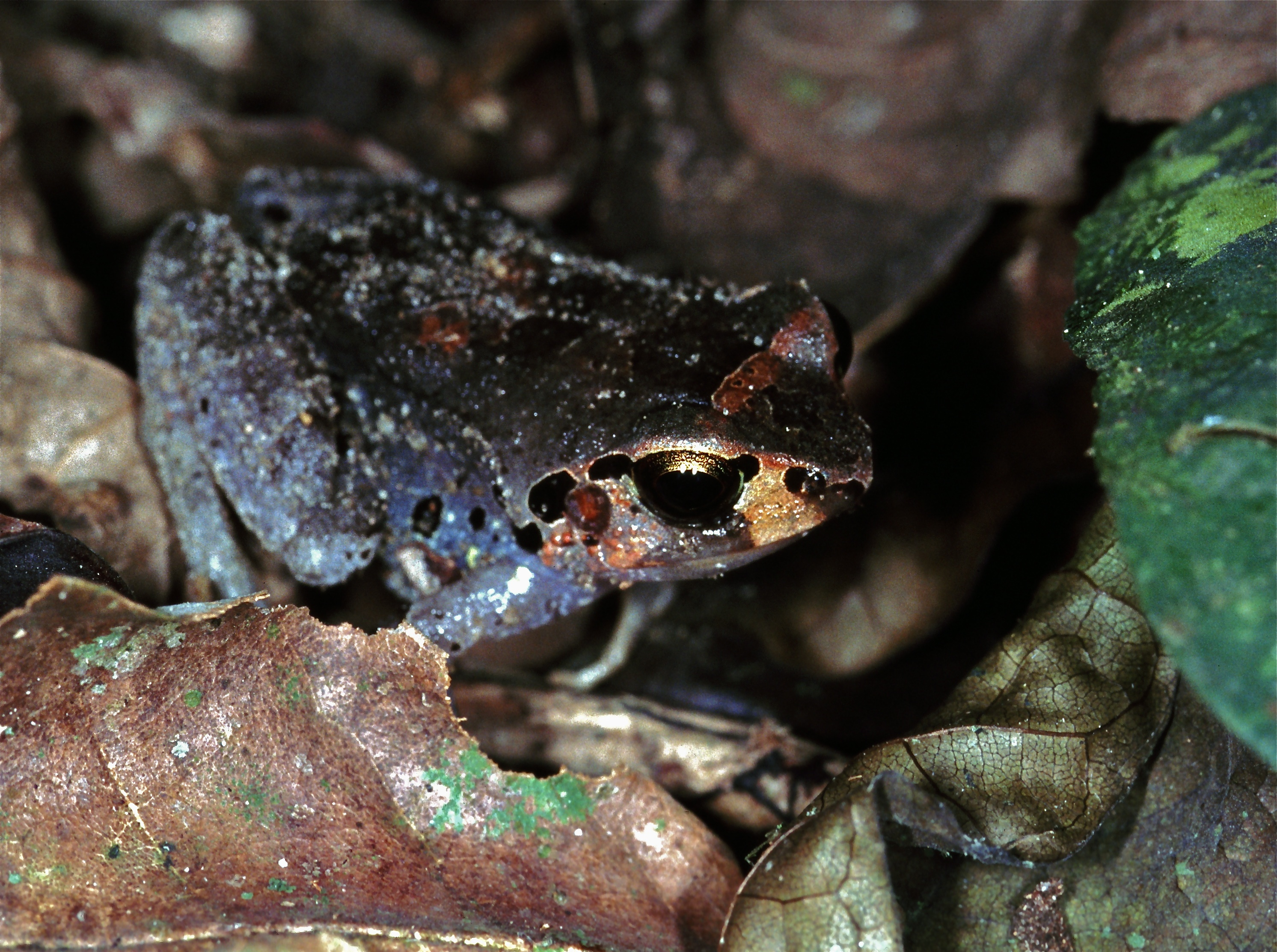

Conservation status
- Least Concern (IUCN 3.1)

Scientific classification
- Kingdom: Animalia
- Phylum: Chordata
- Class: Amphibia
- Order: Anura
- Family: Arthroleptidae
- Genus: Arthroleptis
- Species: A. variabilis

Binomial name
- Arthroleptis variabilis Matschie, 1893

Synonyms
- Arthroleptis Seimundi Boulenger, 1905; Abroscaphus variabilis (Matschie, 1893)

= Arthroleptis variabilis =

Species of amphibian

Arthroleptis variabilis is a species of frog in the family Arthroleptidae. It is found in the lowlands of eastern Nigeria, Cameroon, Equatorial Guinea (including the island of Bioko), Gabon, the Central African Republic, the Republic of the Congo, and the Democratic Republic of the Congo. Earlier records west from Nigeria refer to other species, including Arthroleptis krokosua described in 2008. Common names Buea screeching frog and variable squeaker frog have been coined for it.

== Etymology ==
The specific name variabilis is Latin for "changeable". This presumably refers to the wide range of coloration and pattern seen in the species.

== Description ==
Arthroleptis variabilis is a robust frog with moderately robust limbs. Males measure 26–35 mm (1.0–1.4 in) and females 29–38 mm (1.1–1.5 in) in snout–vent length. The head is somewhat broad. The tympanum is distinct and ovoid. The fingers and toes do not have webbing but there is a very prominent, flange-like inner metatarsal tubercle. Skin is smooth but tending towards glandular posteriorly and is glandular laterally. Coloration is variable. Dorsal base coloration is black, dark gray, brown (dark, light, or ruddy), red, or olive green. Markings on dorsal and lateral surfaces range from tan, orange, light or dark brown to black, When present, mid-vertebral stripe is gray to orange. Ventral surface of throat is generally dark gray to black with white or creamy stripe along midline. The venter is white or gray with light- to dark-gray spots. The inguinal region is from pale yellow to orange red.

== Habitat and conservation ==
Its natural habitats are lowland and montane rainforests up to elevations of 1,200 m (3,900 ft) above sea level. It lives among leaf litter and can be locally abundant. It is probably threatened by habitat loss, but occurs in a number of protected areas.
