= Nike Doggart =

British conservationist and writer

Nike Doggart is a British conservationist, environmental activist, and writer.

Doggart has an MA and a MSc, and was educated at Christ Church, Oxford and at University College, London. She began her career as a marine conservationist in Belize. Her research work in the forests of Tanzania has yielded the discovery of various new species, including a frog from the Eastern Arc Mountains which is named after her, Arthroleptis nikeae.

Doggart is an advisor to the Tanzania Forest Conservation Group. She has successfully lobbied the Tanzanian government to conserve water and forestry resources, and to promote environmentally sustainable forms of economic development. She has promoted the introduction of sustainable commercial butterfly breeding for women living near the Amani Nature Reserve.

Doggart was a presenter and advisor on the BBC's Villages on the Front Line, broadcast in 2006. She is the editor of The Arc Journal.

== Gallery ==
Arthroleptis nikeae

Doggart observing chimpanzee in Mahale, Tanzania
