= Arthroleptis affinis =

Conservation status
- Least Concern (IUCN 3.1)

Scientific classification
- Kingdom: Animalia
- Phylum: Chordata
- Class: Amphibia
- Order: Anura
- Family: Arthroleptidae
- Genus: Arthroleptis
- Species: A. affinis

Binomial name
- Arthroleptis affinis Ahl, 1939

Species of frog

Arthroleptis affinis is a species of frog in the family Arthroleptidae. It is endemic to Tanzania. Its natural habitats are subtropical or tropical moist lowland forests, subtropical or tropical moist montane forests, subtropical or tropical high-altitude grassland, swamps, arable land, pastureland, plantations, rural gardens, heavily degraded former forest, and introduced vegetation.
