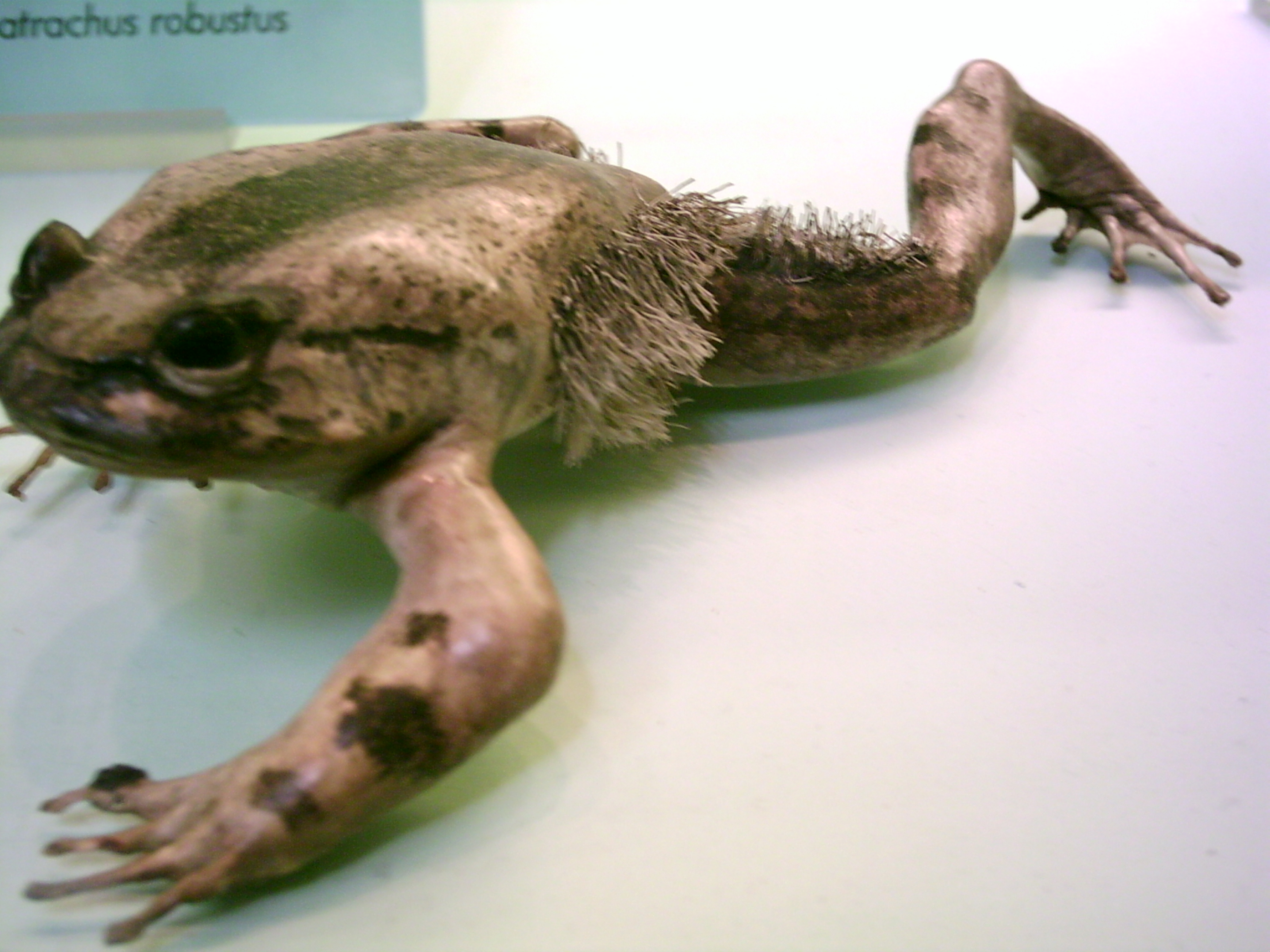
- Male, showing hair-like papillae
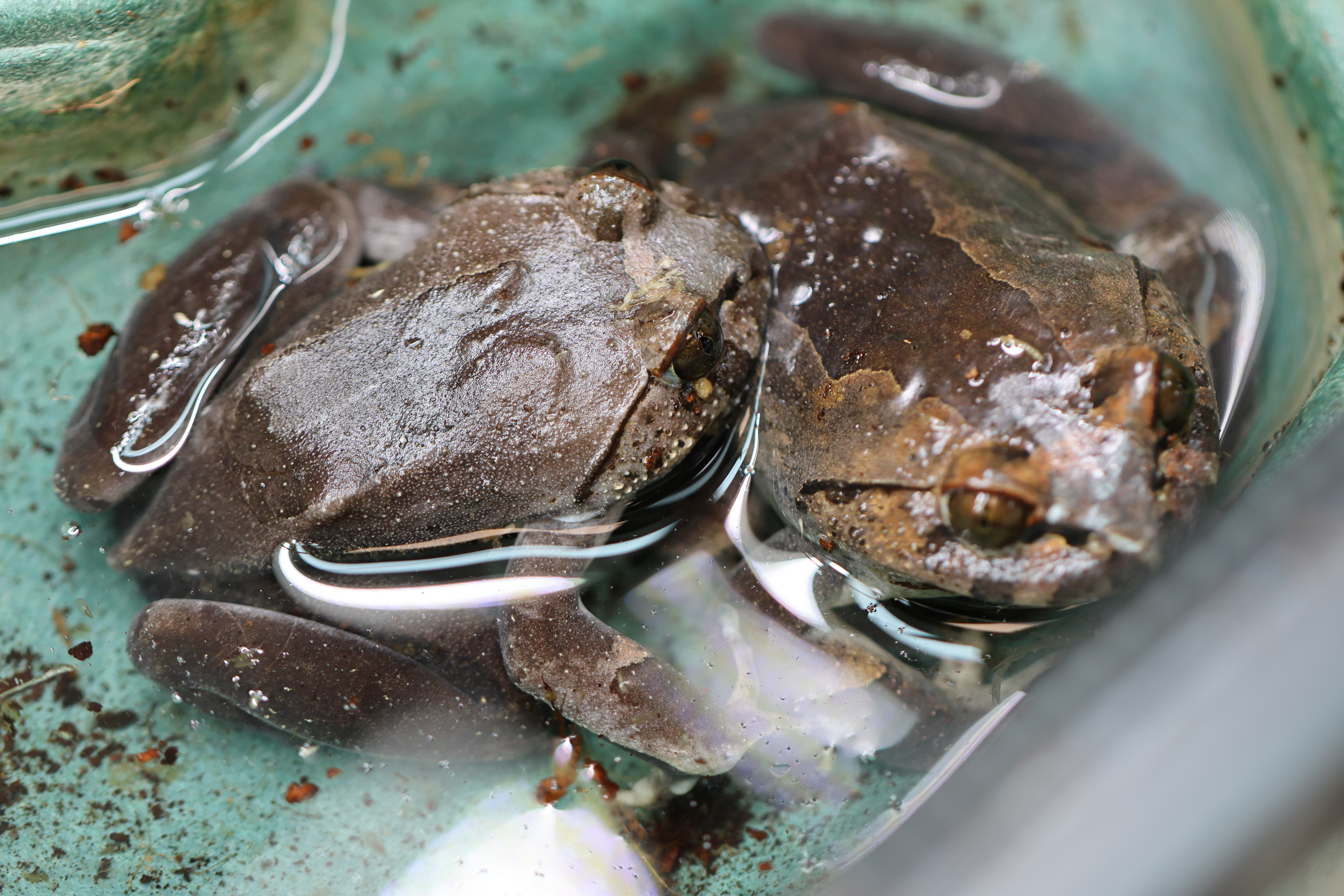

Conservation status
- Least Concern (IUCN 3.1)

Scientific classification
- Kingdom: Animalia
- Phylum: Chordata
- Class: Amphibia
- Order: Anura
- Family: Arthroleptidae
- Subfamily: Astylosterninae
- Genus: Trichobatrachus; Boulenger, 1900
- Species: T. robustus

Binomial name
- Trichobatrachus robustus Boulenger, 1900

Synonyms
- Astylosternus robustus

= Hairy frog =

Species of amphibian

The hairy frog (Trichobatrachus robustus), also known as the horror frog or Wolverine frog, is a Central African species of frog in the family Arthroleptidae. It is typically considered monotypic within the genus Trichobatrachus, but based on its genetics, it should be included in Astylosternus instead. Its common name refers to the somewhat hair-like structures on the body and thighs of the breeding male.

== Description ==
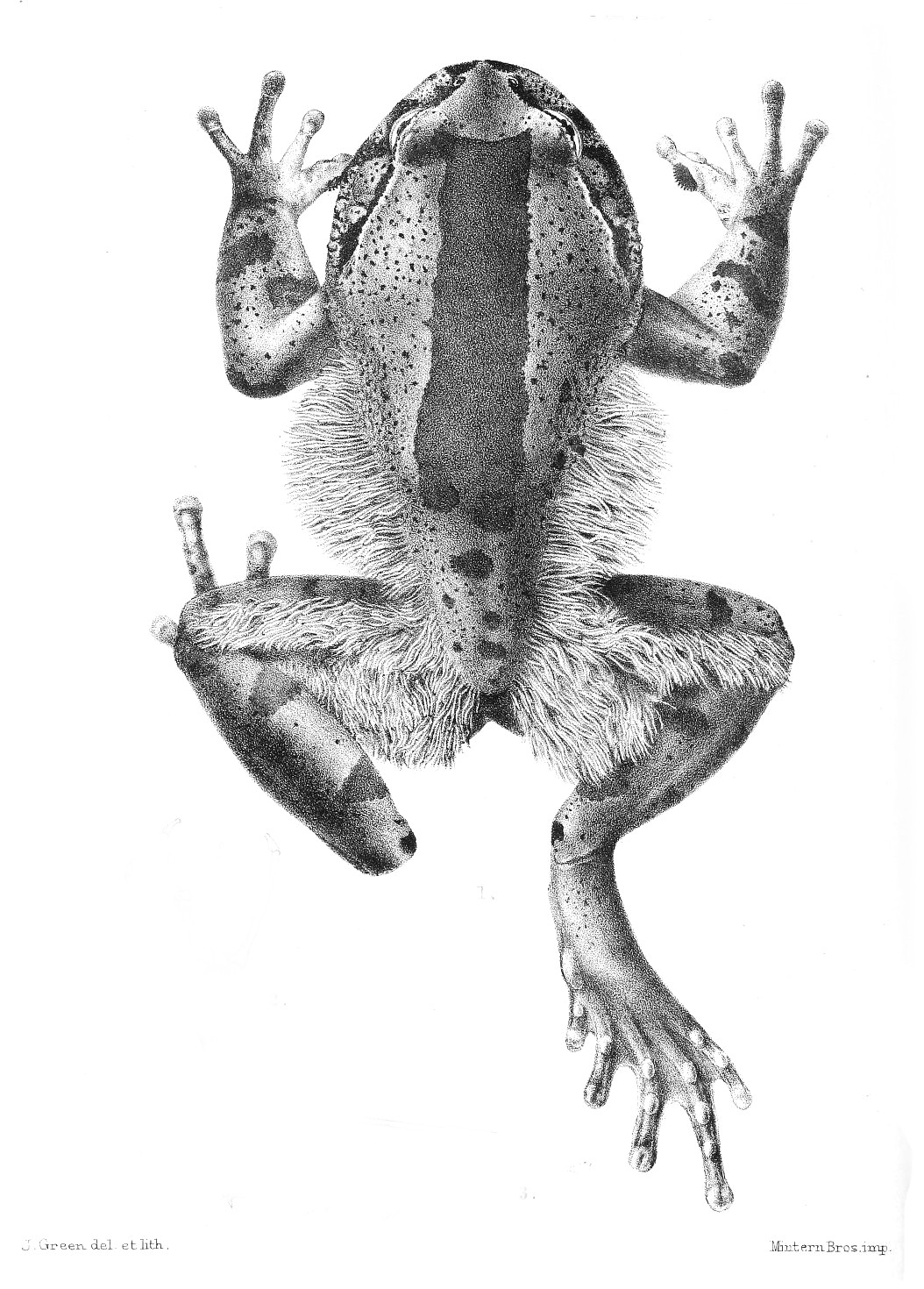
Illustration

Males are about 10–13 cm (4–5 in) long from snout to vent, while females are 8–11 cm (3–4.5 in). The large head is broad and stubby, with a short rounded snout. The males have a paired internal vocal sac and three short ridges of small black spines along the inner surface of the first manual digit. Breeding males also develop hair-like dermal papillae that extend along the flanks and thighs. These contain arteries and are thought to increase the surface area for the purpose of absorbing oxygen (comparably to external gills of the aquatic stage), which is useful as the male stays with his eggs for an extended period of time after they have been laid in the water by the female.

The species is terrestrial, but returns to the water for breeding, where egg masses are laid onto rocks in streams. The quite muscular tadpoles are carnivorous and feature several rows of horned teeth. Adults feed on slugs, myriapods, spiders, beetles, and grasshoppers.

The hairy frog is also notable in possessing retractable "claws", which it may project through the skin, apparently by intentionally breaking the bones of the toe. These are not true claws, as they are made of bone, not keratin. In addition, there is a small bony nodule nestled in the tissue just beyond the frog's fingertip. When sheathed, each claw is anchored to the nodule with tough strands of collagen. When the frog is grabbed or attacked, it breaks the nodule connection and forces the sharpened bones through the skin. Although a retraction mechanism is not known, it has been hypothesized that the claws later retract passively, while the damaged tissue is regenerated.

This type of natural weaponry appears to be unique in the animal kingdom, although the Otton frog possesses a similar "spike" in its thumb. An alternative hypothesis is that the broken bones could provide a better grip on rocks.

== Distribution ==
It is found in Cameroon, Democratic Republic of the Congo, Equatorial Guinea, Gabon, Nigeria, and Angola, where it inhabits fast-flowing rivers in forests and agricultural lands that retain some cover (for example, plantations).

== Conservation status ==
T. robustus faces habitat loss, pollution, hunting for food (to lesser extent, also for the wild animal trade), and perhaps chytridiomycosis. Some populations are decreasing, but it has a large range and is not considered threatened overall.

== Relationship with humans ==
This species is roasted and eaten in Cameroon. They are hunted with long spears or machetes. The Bakossi people traditionally believed that the frogs fall from the sky and, when eaten, would help childless couples become fertile.

== See also ==
- Gerald Durrell
