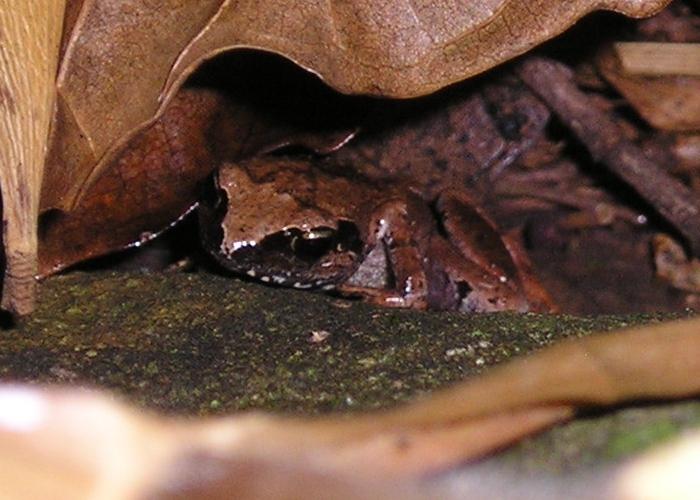
- Arthroleptis wahlbergii

Scientific classification
- Kingdom: Animalia
- Phylum: Chordata
- Class: Amphibia
- Order: Anura
- Family: Arthroleptidae
- Subfamily: Arthroleptinae
- Genus: Arthroleptis; Smith, 1849

Type species
- Arthroleptis wahlbergii Smith, 1849

Diversity
- About 47 species (see text)

Synonyms
- Schoutedenella De Witte, 1921

= Arthroleptis =

Genus of amphibians

Arthroleptis is a genus of frogs in the family Arthroleptidae found in tropical sub-Saharan Africa. Their common names include screeching frogs, sometimes simply squeakers.

== Description ==
These species are terrestrial breeding, with direct development (metamorphosis to froglets occurs within the egg). Many species in this genus are small, or very small, frogs with a minimum adult size of 15 mm (0.59 in) snout-vent length. The largest species (Arthroleptis nikeae and Arthroleptis tanneri) reach body lengths around 55 mm (2.2 in). It was hypothesized that small species evolved from larger ones, but in fact the opposite seems to be the case.

Arthroleptis species are terrestrial leaf-litter frogs that feed on a range of terrestrial arthropods, such as ants and termites.

== Species ==
Forty-seven to 49 species are known; this list follows the Amphibian Species of the World:

Common name	Binomial name
Foulassi screeching frog	Arthroleptis adelphus Perret, 1966
Rugegewald screeching frog	Arthroleptis adolfifriederici Nieden, 1911
Ahl's squeaker	Arthroleptis affinis Ahl, 1939
Earless squeaker	Arthroleptis anotis Loader, Poynton, Lawson, Blackburn, and Menegon, 2011
Freetown long-fingered frog	Arthroleptis aureoli (Schiøtz, 1964)
Bioko squeaker frog	Arthroleptis bioko Blackburn, 2010
Tumbo-Insel screeching frog	Arthroleptis bivittatus Müller, 1885
Togo screeching frog	Arthroleptis brevipes Ahl, 1924
Carqueja's squeaker	Arthroleptis carquejai Ferreira, 1906
Guinea screeching frog	Arthroleptis crusculum Angel, 1950
	Arthroleptis fichika Blackburn, 2009
	Arthroleptis formosus Rödel, Kouamé, Doumbia, and Sandberger, 2011
Ruo River screeching frog	Arthroleptis francei Loveridge, 1953
Itombwe screeching frog	Arthroleptis hematogaster (Laurent, 1954)
	Arthroleptis kidogo Blackburn, 2009
Krokosua squeaking frog, Giant squeaker frog	Arthroleptis krokosua Ernst, Agyei, and Rödel, 2008
Overlooked squeaker frog	Arthroleptis kutogundua Blackburn, 2012
Lameer's squeaker	Arthroleptis lameerei De Witte, 1921
Lonnberg's squeaker	Arthroleptis langeri Rödel, Doumbia, Johnson, and Hillers, 2009
Loveridge's screeching frog	Arthroleptis loveridgei De Witte, 1933
Mosso screeching frog	Arthroleptis mossoensis (Laurent, 1954)
	Arthroleptis nguruensis Poynton, Menegon, and Loader, 2009
Nike's squeaker	Arthroleptis nikeae Poynton, 2003
Mount Nimba screeching frog	Arthroleptis nimbaensis Angel, 1950
	Arthroleptis nlonakoensis (Plath, Herrmann, and Böhme, 2006)
Problem squeaker frog	Arthroleptis palava Blackburn, Gvoždík, and Leaché, 2010
	Arthroleptis perreti Blackburn, Gonwouo, Ernst, and Rödel, 2009
Lomami screeching frog	Arthroleptis phrynoides (Laurent, 1976)
Mottled squeaker	Arthroleptis poecilonotus Peters, 1863
Kivu screeching frog	Arthroleptis pyrrhoscelis Laurent, 1952
Reiche's squeaker	Arthroleptis reichei Nieden, 1911
Schubotz's squeaker	Arthroleptis schubotzi Nieden, 1911
Tanganyika screeching frog	Arthroleptis spinalis Boulenger, 1919
Common squeaker	Arthroleptis stenodactylus Pfeffer, 1893
Kambai squeaker, Strident squeaker	Arthroleptis stridens (Pickersgill, 2007)
Forest screeching frog	Arthroleptis sylvaticus (Laurent, 1954)
Striped screeching frog	Arthroleptis taeniatus Boulenger, 1906
Tanzania screeching frog	Arthroleptis tanneri Grandison, 1983
Cave squeaker	Arthroleptis troglodytes Poynton, 1963
Rainforest screeching frog	Arthroleptis tuberosus Andersson, 1905
Buea screeching frog	Arthroleptis variabilis Matschie, 1893
Mwana screeching frog	Arthroleptis vercammeni (Laurent, 1954)
	Arthroleptis wageri FitzSimons, 1930
Wahlberg's humus Frog	Arthroleptis wahlbergii Smith, 1849
Plain squeaker	Arthroleptis xenochirus Boulenger, 1905
Dwarf squeaker	Arthroleptis xenodactyloides Hewitt, 1933
Eastern squeaker	Arthroleptis xenodactylus Boulenger, 1909
Zimmer's screeching frog	Arthroleptis zimmeri (Ahl, 1925)
