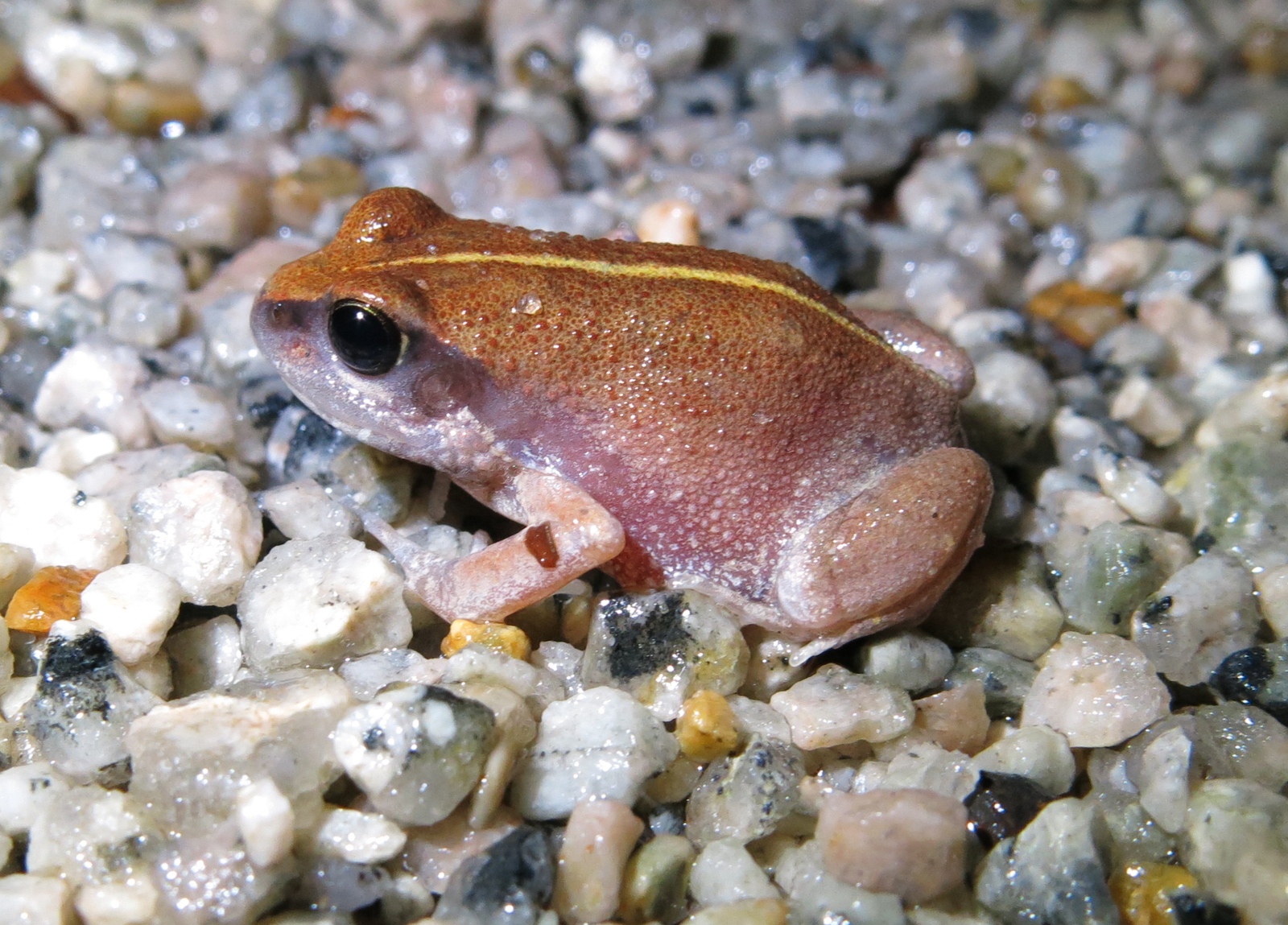

Conservation status
- Least Concern (IUCN 3.1)

Scientific classification
- Kingdom: Animalia
- Phylum: Chordata
- Class: Amphibia
- Order: Anura
- Family: Arthroleptidae
- Genus: Arthroleptis
- Species: A. xenochirus

Binomial name
- Arthroleptis xenochirus Boulenger, 1905

Synonyms
- Schoutedenella xenochirus (Boulenger, 1905); Schoutedenella globosa De Witte, 1921

= Arthroleptis xenochirus =

Species of frog

The plain squeaker or Marimba screeching frog (Arthroleptis xenochirus) is a species of frog in the family Arthroleptidae. It is found in Angola, Democratic Republic of the Congo, Malawi, and Zambia, and possibly in the adjacent Tanzania. Its natural habitats are open grassland near streams, and forest patches. It can also occur on the edge of plantations and in rural gardens. It is very common frog in suitable habitats, and there are no significant threats to this adaptable species.
