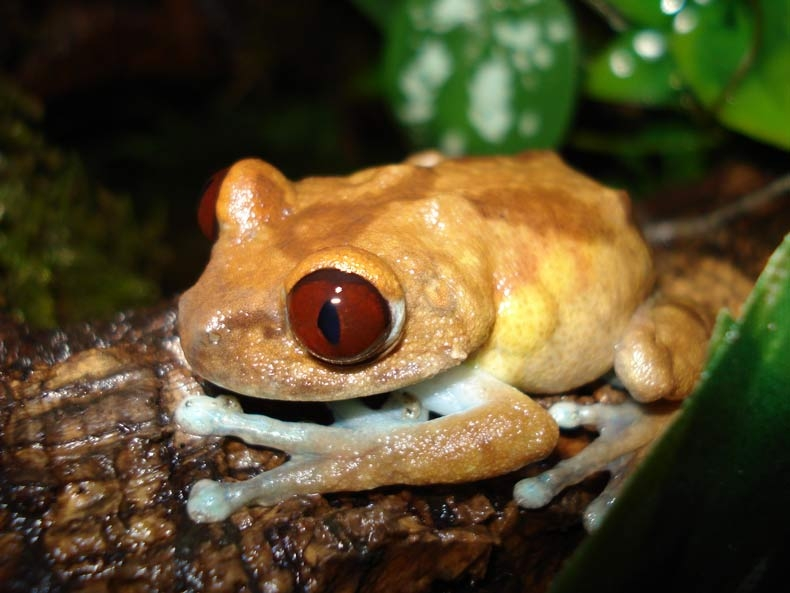
- Leptopelis uluguruensis

Scientific classification
- Kingdom: Animalia
- Phylum: Chordata
- Class: Amphibia
- Order: Anura
- Clade: Afrobatrachia
- Family: Arthroleptidae; Mivart, 1869

Genera
- See text

= Arthroleptidae =

Family of amphibians

The Arthroleptidae /ˌɑːrθroʊˈlɛptɪdiː/ are a family of frogs found in sub-Saharan Africa. This group includes African treefrogs in the genus Leptopelis along with the terrestrial breeding squeakers Arthroleptis, and several genera restricted to the Guinean forests of central and west Africa, such as the hairy frog (Trichobatrachus).

== Taxonomy ==
This family is the phylogenetic sister group of reed frogs, the Hyperoliidae, which together form the lineage Laurentobatrachia, a name that commemorates work on African frogs by the Argentine herpetologist Raymond Laurent. This group is further nested within the Afrobatrachia, an ancient African endemic lineage that includes the Brevicipitidae and Hemisotidae. The Arthroleptidae are separated, based on phylogenetic analyses, into three deeply divergent and dissimilar subfamilies: Arthroleptinae, Astylosterninae, and Leptopelinae. Some consider these to be separate families, while others do not recognize any subfamilies, in particular due to uncertainty in the phylogenetic placement of Leptopelis and Scotobleps.

The three subfamilies consist of these genera:

Subfamilia	Species	Common name	Scientific name
Arthroleptinae; Mivart, 1869	48	Screeching frogs	Arthroleptis Smith, 1849
Arthroleptinae; Mivart, 1869	19	Long-fingered frogs	Cardioglossa Boulenger, 1900
Astylosterninae; Noble, 1927	12	Night frogs	Astylosternus Werner, 1898
Astylosterninae; Noble, 1927	15	Egg frogs	Leptodactylodon Andersson, 1903
Astylosterninae; Noble, 1927	1	Southern night frog	Nyctibates Boulenger, 1904
Astylosterninae; Noble, 1927	1	Gaboon forest frog	Scotobleps Boulenger, 1900
Astylosterninae; Noble, 1927	1	Hairy frog	Trichobatrachus Boulenger, 1900
Leptopelinae; Laurent, 1972	54	Forest treefrogs	Leptopelis Günther, 1859

== Further information ==
- ADW: Arthroleptidae: Information
- Cogger, H.G.; R.G. Zweifel; D. Kirschner (2004). Encyclopedia of Reptiles & Amphibians Second Edition. Fog City Press. ISBN 1-877019-69-0.
