= Leptopelis modestus =

Conservation status
- Least Concern (IUCN 3.1)

Scientific classification
- Kingdom: Animalia
- Phylum: Chordata
- Class: Amphibia
- Order: Anura
- Family: Arthroleptidae
- Genus: Leptopelis
- Species: L. modestus

Binomial name
- Leptopelis modestus (Werner, 1898)

Synonyms
- Hylambates rufus var. modesta Werner, 1898; Hylambates rufus var. ventrimaculata Werner, 1898

Species of amphibian

Leptopelis modestus is a species of frog in the family Arthroleptidae. Its common names are modest forest treefrog and plain tree frog.

== Distribution and taxonomy ==
Leptopelis modestus was described in 1898 by Franz Werner, an Austrian zoologist and explorer, based on specimens (syntypes) collected from Cameroon. The reported distribution varies by source, partly depending on whether the stated distribution accounts for recently described species (e.g., Leptopelis mtoewaate, Leptopelis mackayi). According to the Amphibian Species of the World, Leptopelis modestus is only found in southeastern Nigeria and Cameroon. The IUCN Red List (2008) also mentions the island of Bioko (Equatorial Guinea) and eastern Democratic Republic of Congo, but remarks that the latter likely refers to a (then) undescribed species. Leptopelis fiziensis from eastern Democratic Republic of Congo and western Tanzania was originally included in this species as a subspecies.

== Description ==
Adult males measure 26–35 mm (1.0–1.4 in) and females 36–41 mm (1.4–1.6 in) in snout–vent length. The dorsum is greyish brown with an indistinct, darker hour-glass pattern. Some populations show a conspicuous white spot below the eye. Throat in calling males is green or blue, a characteristic that differentiates this species from Leptopelis hyloides and Leptopelis aubryi, along with its larger digital discs and different voice.

The male advertisement call is a deep, unmelodious, drawn-out clack, sometimes repeated twice. Sometimes also a brief clack is emitted.

== Habitat and conservation ==
Leptopelis modestus occurs in montane forests and secondary brush where it lives around streams in thick vegetation. It does not occur in open areas outside forest. Breeding takes place in still water and marshes. It is a common species, but it is impacted by habitat loss caused by human settlements, agriculture, and the collection of wood.
