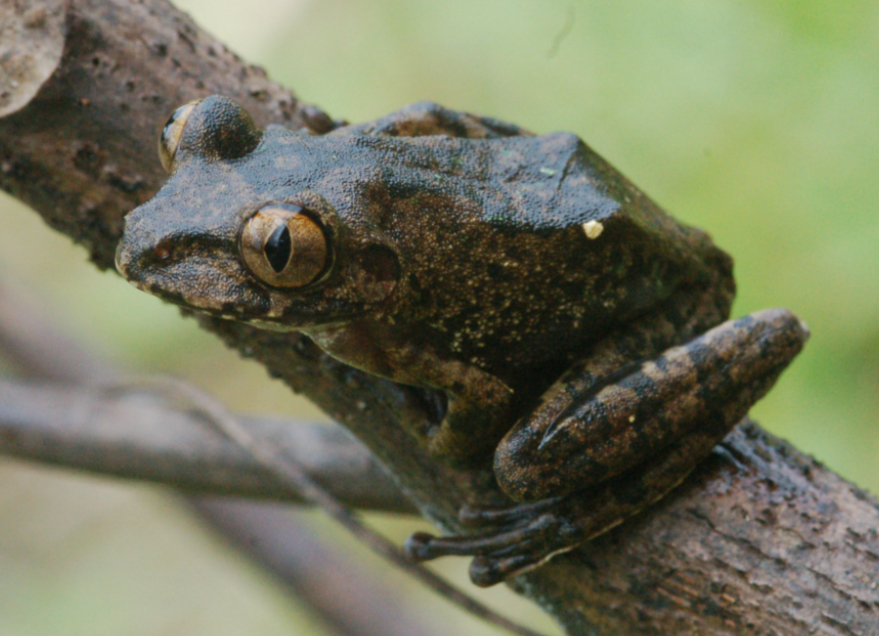

Conservation status
- Least Concern (IUCN 3.1)

Scientific classification
- Kingdom: Animalia
- Phylum: Chordata
- Class: Amphibia
- Order: Anura
- Family: Arthroleptidae
- Genus: Leptopelis
- Species: L. millsoni

Binomial name
- Leptopelis millsoni (Boulenger, 1895)

Synonyms
- Hylambates millsoni Boulenger, 1895 "1894; Leptopelis guineensis Ahl, 1929

= Leptopelis millsoni =

Species of amphibian

Leptopelis millsoni is a species of frog in the family Arthroleptidae. It is found in southeastern Nigeria, Cameroon, the Central African Republic, Equatorial Guinea, Gabon, the Republic of the Congo, the eastern Democratic Republic of the Congo, and northwestern Angola. Common names Niger forest treefrog (perhaps referring to the mouth of the Niger River, its type locality.) and Millson's tree frog have been coined for it. There is a need of taxonomic revision of this taxon.

== Etymology ==
The specific name millsoni refers to Mr. Alvan Millson, assistant colonial secretary in Lagos and the collector the two female syntypes.

== Taxonomy ==
Leptopelis millsoni was described by the Belgian-British zoologist George Albert Boulenger in 1895 based on the syntypes from the Niger Delta. Based on call characteristics and morphology, it has been suggested that the West African species Leptopelis macrotis is the same species (synonym) as L. millsoni, or its subspecies. A genetic comparisons between the eastern and the western species revealed clear differences, and also their calls differ in detail, strongly suggesting that they are distinct species. However, as these comparisons did not involve materials from the type locality of L. millsoni (the Niger delta), the question whether this name applies to the West African species (L. macrotis as currently defined) is not resolved. If this were the case, name Leptopelis guineensis would be available for the Central African species (L. millsoni as currently defined). It also remains possible that the Niger Delta species is distinct from both the eastern and the western species.

== Description ==
Adult males measure 40–49 mm (1.6–1.9 in) and females 74–87 mm (2.9–3.4 in) in snout–vent length. The dorsum is brown, with darker transverse bars, or green. The tibia has 4–5 bars, and the feet are fully webbed. The iris is rusty red. The tympanum is rather large.

The male advertisement call consists of single calls and has a "peculiar" acoustic quality. The call is similar to the call of Leptopelis notatus, and very similar to that of Leptopelis macrotis. However, the similarity of calls was refuted by Rödel and colleagues.

== Habitat and conservation ==
Leptopelis millsoni is an arboreal frog found in primary and secondary lowland rainforest, secondary growth, and palm plantations. It is typically found near large, slow-flowing watercourses; the males call from branches close to such streams. It does not survive in open, degraded habitats. If similar to other species of Leptopelis, it would lay eggs in a nest on the ground near water. It is a common species but its habitat is affected by habitat loss caused by agricultural expansion, logging, and human settlements. It occurs in a number of protected areas, including the Korup National Park in Cameroon.
