= Leptopelis rugosus =

Scientific classification
- Kingdom: Animalia
- Phylum: Chordata
- Class: Amphibia
- Order: Anura
- Family: Arthroleptidae
- Genus: Leptopelis
- Species: L. rugosus

Binomial name
- Leptopelis rugosus (Ahl, 1924)

Synonyms
- Pseudocassina rugosa Ahl, 1924; Leptopelis montanus Tiutenko & Zinenko, 2021; Pseudocassina ocellata Ahl, 1924

Species of frog

Leptopelis rugosus, the rugose burrowing treefrog, is a species of frog in the family Arthroleptidae. Native to Ethiopia, it is usually found living in the grassy meadows of the Ethiopian highlands at elevations of 2,339–3,337 m (7,674–10,948 ft) above sea level.

== Description ==
Leptopelis rugosus is dark olive brown with a yellowish stripe extending up its upper arm and brown spots around its face and lower body. Males usually measure to around 38.7 mm (1.52 in) and females measure around 52.4 mm (2.06 in), showing high sexual dimorphism.

== Behaviour ==
The call of Leptopelis rugosus is a short rattle; it is easily differentiated from the calls of L. gramineus and L. diffidens by the lower number of pulses per note and shorter note duration.
