= Shoulder girdle =

Set of bones which connects the arm to the axial skeleton on each side

- Human shoulder girdle or pectoral girdle

Details

Identifiers
- Latin: cingulum pectorale
- TA98: A01.1.00.020
- TA2: 361
- FMA: 23217

The shoulder girdle or pectoral girdle is the set of bones in the appendicular skeleton which connects to the arm on each side. In humans, it consists of the clavicle and scapula; in those species with three bones in the shoulder, it consists of the clavicle, scapula, and coracoid. Some mammalian species (such as the dog and the horse) have only the scapula.

The pectoral girdle is to the upper limbs as the pelvic girdle is to the lower limbs; the girdles are the part of the appendicular skeleton that anchor the appendages to the axial skeleton.

In humans, the only true anatomical joints between the shoulder girdle and the axial skeleton are the sternoclavicular joints on each side. No anatomical joint exists between each scapula and the rib cage; instead the muscular connection or physiological joint between the two permits great mobility of the shoulder girdle compared to the compact pelvic girdle; because the upper limb is not usually involved in weight bearing, its stability has been sacrificed in exchange for greater mobility. In those species having only the scapula, no joint exists between the forelimb and the thorax, the only attachment being muscular.

== In humans ==
The shoulder girdle is the anatomical mechanism that allows for all upper arm and shoulder movement in humans.

=== Muscles ===
The shoulder girdle consists of five muscles that attach to the clavicle and scapula and allow for the motion of the sternoclavicular joint (connection between sternum and clavicle) and acromioclavicular joint (connection between clavicle and scapula). The five muscles that comprise the function of the shoulder girdle are the trapezius muscle (upper, middle, and lower), levator scapulae muscle, rhomboid muscles (major and minor), serratus anterior muscle, and pectoralis minor muscle.

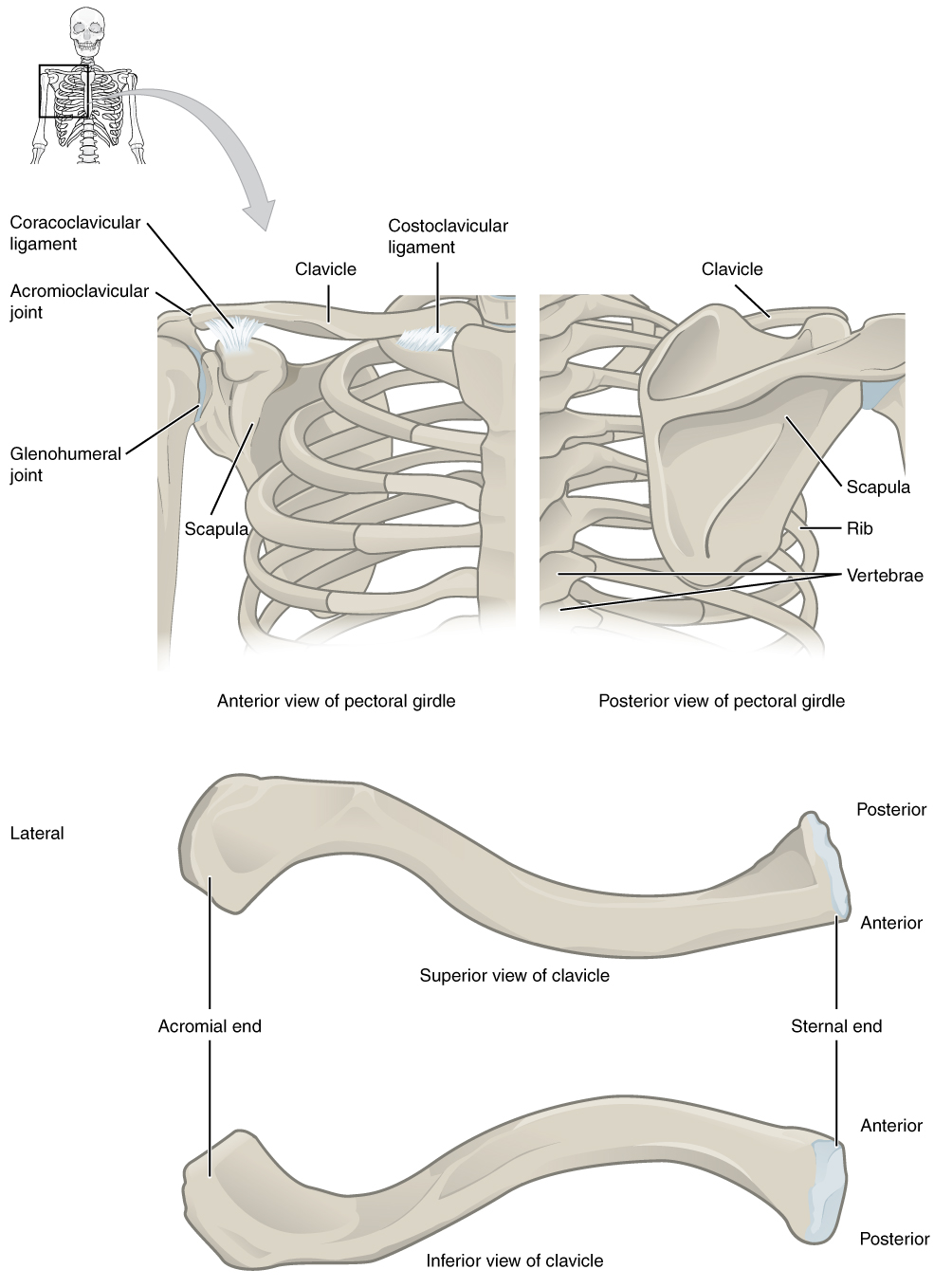
The shoulder girdle consists of the clavicle and the scapula, which serve to attach the upper limb to the sternum of the axial skeleton.

=== Joints ===
The shoulder girdle is a complex of 5 joints that can be divided into two groups. 3 of these joints are true anatomical joints, while 2 are physiological ("false") joints. (Note: Physiological joints are called "false" joints because they lack the characteristics of "true" anatomical joints, such as tendons and a capsule, but they are still joints because the gliding movements they provide play an important biomechanical role. (Roy 2009, Focused anatomy)) Within each group, the joints are mechanically linked so that both groups simultaneously contribute to the different movements of the shoulder to variable degrees.

In the first group, the scapulohumeral or glenohumeral joint is the anatomical joint mechanically linked to the physiological subdeltoid or suprahumeral joint (the "second shoulder joint") so that movements in the suprahumeral joint results in movements in the glenohumeral joint.

In the second group, the scapulocostal or scapulothoracic joint is the important physiological joint that can not function without the two anatomical joints in the group, the acromioclavicular and sternoclavicular joints, i.e. they join both ends of the clavicle.

==== Glenohumeral joint ====
The glenohumeral joint is the articulation between the head of the humerus and the glenoid cavity of the scapula. It is a ball and socket type of synovial joint with three rotatory and three translatory degrees of freedom. The glenohumeral joint allows for adduction, abduction, medial and lateral rotation, flexion and extension of the arm.

==== Acromioclavicular joint ====
The acromioclavicular joint is the articulation between the acromion process of the scapula and the lateral end of the clavicle. It is a plane type of synovial joint. The acromion of the scapula rotates on the acromial end of the clavicle.

==== Sternoclavicular joint ====
The sternoclavicular joint is the articulation of the manubrium of the sternum and the first costal cartilage with the medial end of the clavicle. It is a saddle type of synovial joint but functions as a plane joint. The sternoclavicular joint accommodates a wide range of scapula movements and can be raised to a 60° angle

==== Scapulocostal joint ====
The scapulocostal joint (also known as the scapulothoracic joint) is a physiological joint formed by an articulation of the anterior scapula and the posterior thoracic rib cage. It is musculotendinous in nature and is formed predominantly by the trapezius, rhomboids and serratus anterior muscles. The pectoralis minor also plays a role in its movements. The gliding movements at the scapulocostal joint are elevation, depression, retraction, protraction and superior and inferior rotation of the scapula. Disorders of the scapulocostal joint are not very common and usually restricted to snapping scapula.

==== Suprahumeral joint ====
The suprahumeral joint (also known as the subacromial joint) is a physiological joint formed by an articulation of the coracoacromial ligament and the head of the humerus. It is formed by the gap between the humerus and the acromion process of the scapula. This space is filled mostly by the subacromial bursa and the tendon of supraspinatus. This joint plays a role during complex movements while the arm is fully flexed at the glenohumeral joint, such as changing a lightbulb, or painting a ceiling.

=== Movements ===
From its neutral position, the shoulder girdle can be rotated about an imaginary vertical axis at the medial end of the clavicle (the sternoclavicular joint). Throughout this movement the scapula is rotated around the chest wall so that it moves 15 centimetres (5.9 in) laterally and the glenoid cavity is rotated 40–45° in the horizontal plane.

When the scapula is moved medially it lies in a frontal plane with the glenoid cavity facing directly laterally. At this position, the lateral end of the clavicle is rotated posteriorly so that the angle at the acromioclavicular joint opens up slightly. When the scapula is moved laterally it lies in a sagittal plane with the glenoid cavity facing anteriorly. At this position, the lateral end of the clavicle is rotated anteriorly so that the clavicle lies in a frontal plane. While this slightly closes the angle between the clavicle and the scapula, it also widens the shoulder.

The scapula can be elevated and depressed from the neutral position to a total range of 10 to 12 centimetres (3.9 to 4.7 in); at its most elevated position the scapula is always tilted so that the glenoid cavity is facing superiorly. During this tilting, the scapula rotates to a maximum angle of 60° about an axis passing perpendicularly through the bone slightly below the spine; this causes the inferior angle to move 10 to 12 centimetres (3.9 to 4.7 in) and the lateral angle 5 to 6 centimetres (2.0 to 2.4 in).

=== Injury ===
Shoulders are a common place for tissue injuries, especially if the person plays overhead sports such as tennis, volleyball, baseball, swimming, etc. According to Bahr's major injury related statistics, shoulder dislocations or subluxations account for 4% of injuries in adults ages 20–30 and 20% of shoulder injuries are fractures. Damage to the shoulder and adjacent features can fluctuate in severity depending on the person's age, sport, position, recurring shoulder dysfunction, and many other factors. Some other common shoulder injuries are fractures to any shoulder girdle bones i.e. clavicle, ligamentous sprains such as AC joint or GH ligaments, rotator cuff injuries, different labral tears, and other acute or chronic conditions related to shoulder anatomy.

Shoulder girdle pain can be acute or chronic and be due to a number of causes. Inflammation or injury of associated tendons, bone, muscles, nerves, ligaments, and cartilage can all cause pain. Also, past injury compensation, and stress can result in complicated shoulder pain.

=== Disorders ===
In humans, winged scapula is a condition in which the shoulder blade protrudes from a person's back in an abnormal position.

== Other animals ==
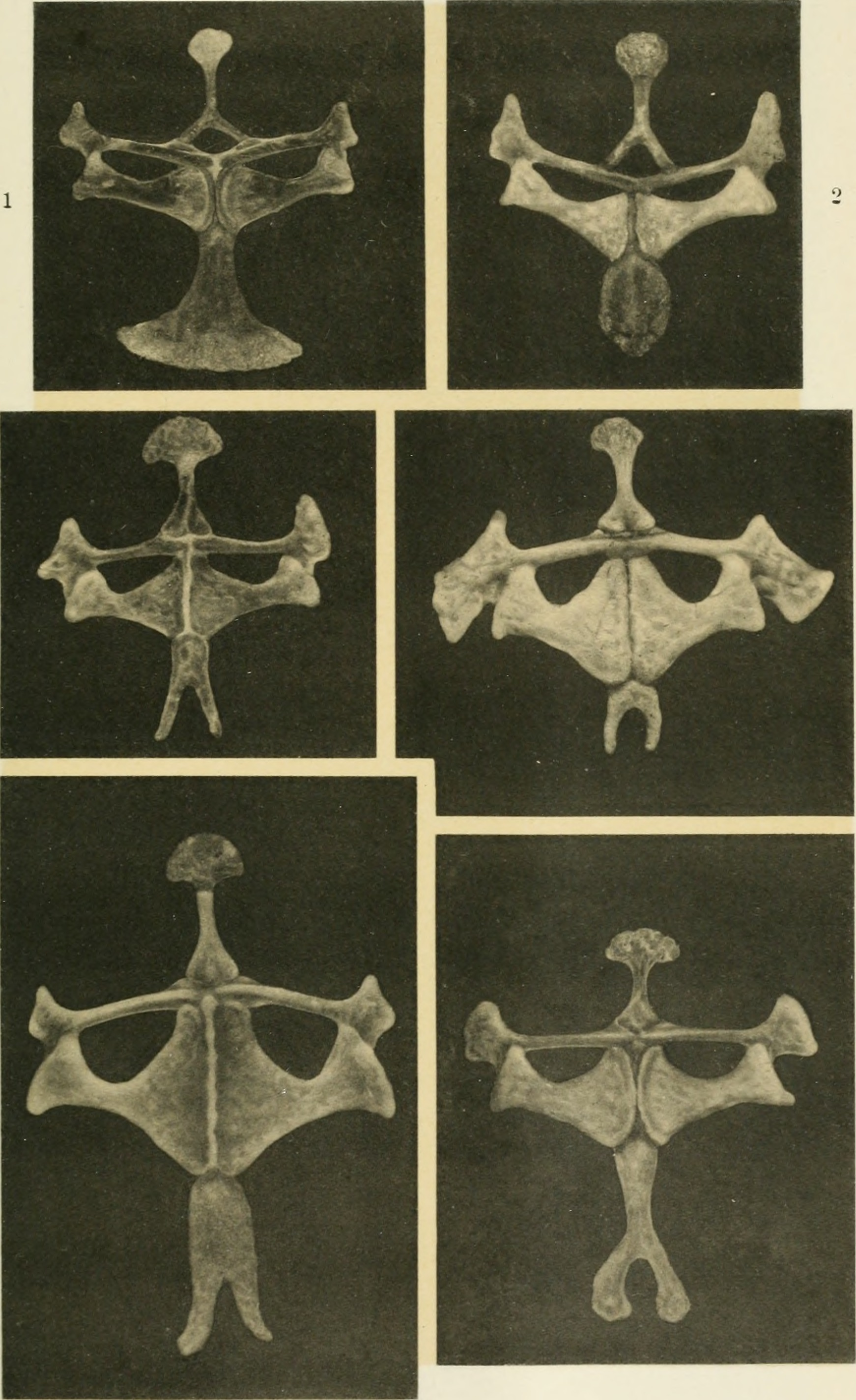
The shoulder girdle of various hyperoliid frogs: Phlyctimantis verrucosus, Cryptothylax greshoffii, Leptopelis calcaratus, Leptopelis anchietae, Leptopelis aubryi and Leptopelis brevirostris.

The pectoral girdle demonstrates an enormous variation in amniotes (vertebrates adapted to a full terrestrial life), both among extant species and along evolutionary lines, and determining homologies for individual pectoral elements is difficult. Except for the sternum, these elements (along with the pelvic girdle) were, however, present in early bony fishes before there were even limbs, arising from their ancestral external armor plates. In digitless choanates, the cleithrum, clavicle, and interclavicle are dermal and linked to the caudal part of the head while the humerus articulates with a small scapulocoracoid bone. As the first digits appeared, the pectoral structure lost its direct connection to the head skeleton while the scapulocoracoid grew more prominent and started to face laterally. In true tetrapods, the dermal part of the girdle was gradually reduced and the scapulocoracoid split into a dorsal scapula and a ventral coracoid. As for the sternum, it also came from the fusion of the inner ends of the pectoral girdles in tetrapods, subsequently growing between the ribs.

=== In dinosaurs ===
In dinosaurs, the main bones of the pectoral girdle were the scapula (shoulder blade) and the coracoid, both of which directly articulated with the clavicle. The clavicle was present in saurischian dinosaurs but largely absent in ornithischian dinosaurs. The place on the scapula where it articulated with the humerus (upper bone of the forelimb) is the called the glenoid. The scapula served as the attachment site for a dinosaur's back and forelimb muscles.

=== In primates ===
Chimpanzees are far better at brachiation than humans. Their clavicles possess a cranially oriented twist on the acromial end, conducive to better force transfer through it - a very important function in arboreal locomotion. Chimpanzee scapulas also possess a considerably larger supraspinous fossa, allowing for a larger supraspinatus muscle. Through the process of evolution, humans have lost the atlantoclavicularis muscle, originating on the atlas of the vertebral column, and inserting onto the acromial clavicle. This muscle acts to elevate the clavicle.

=== In placoderms ===
A specimen of the placoderm Kolymaspis demonstrates that the shoulder girdle evolved from gill arches present in ancient vertebrates.

== See also ==
- Shoulder
- Human skeletal changes due to bipedalism
