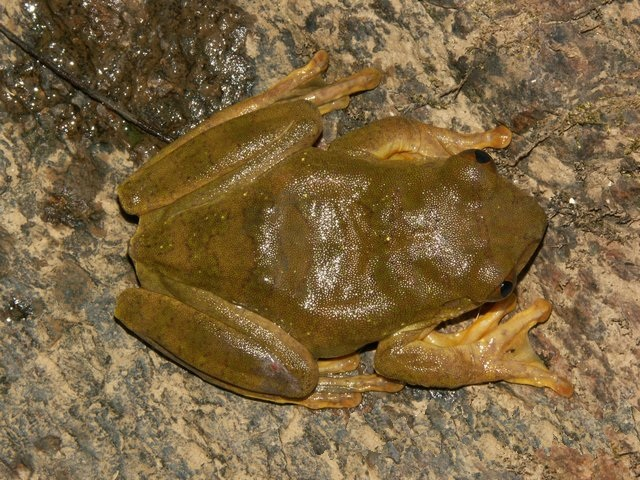

Conservation status
- Least Concern (IUCN 3.1)

Scientific classification
- Kingdom: Animalia
- Phylum: Chordata
- Class: Amphibia
- Order: Anura
- Family: Arthroleptidae
- Genus: Leptopelis
- Species: L. rufus

Binomial name
- Leptopelis rufus Reichenow, 1874

Synonyms
- Hylambates rufus (Reichenow, 1874)

= Red tree frog =

Species of amphibian

The red tree frog (Leptopelis rufus) is a species of frog in the family Arthroleptidae. It is found in southeasternmost Nigeria, western Cameroon, Equatorial Guinea, western Gabon, the lower Republic of the Congo, the lower Democratic Republic of the Congo, and northwestern Angola. It has been confused with several other species, in particular with the palm forest tree frog Leptopelis palmatus.

== Description ==
Adult males measure 45–55 mm (1.8–2.2 in) and females 74–87 mm (2.9–3.4 in) in snout–vent length. The dorsum is brown with darker irregular transverse bars. The tibia have 3–4 bars. The feet are fully webbed. The iris is golden. The tympanum is a rather small, a characteristic that separates it from similar species like Leptopelis palmatus and Leptopelis macrotis.

The male advertisement call is a series (about ten) long "yiin" cries. A male approaching a female may emit a different, quiet call, sounding like the meow of a young cat.

== Habitat and conservation ==
This arboreal species' inhabits humid lowland rainforests. It also occurs in secondary forests. The males call from branches in the forest or from Raphia palms, typically above small streams. A pair in copula was found in the low vegetation near a small stream. Presumably, the eggs are laid in nests on land close to the water.

Leptopelis rufus is a reasonably common species, but it is affected by habitat loss caused by expanding human settlements and agriculture as well as harvesting of wood. It occurs in a number of protected areas, including the Korup National Park (Cameroon) and Monte Alén National Park (Equatorial Guinea).
