= Leptopelis marginatus =

Conservation status
- Data Deficient (IUCN 3.1)

Scientific classification
- Kingdom: Animalia
- Phylum: Chordata
- Class: Amphibia
- Order: Anura
- Family: Arthroleptidae
- Genus: Leptopelis
- Species: L. marginatus

Binomial name
- Leptopelis marginatus (Bocage, 1895)
- Leptopelis marginatus is only known from Quissange, Angola

Synonyms
- Hylambates marginatus Bocage, 1895

Species of amphibian

Leptopelis marginatus is a species of frog in the family Arthroleptidae. It is endemic to western Angola and only known from the holotype collected from Quissange. The holotype was lost in the fire of the Natural History Museum of Lisbon in 1978. The validity of this species is in question; it might be a synonym of Leptopelis bocagii or considered a nomen dubium. Common name Quissange forest treefrog has been proposed for it.

== Description ==
The fingers have no webbing whereas the toes are partially webbed. The finger and toe tips are very slightly dilated. The feet are relatively long, more than half the length of the head and body.

== Habitat and conservation ==
Leptopelis marginatus is associated with the Great Escarpment of Angola, but the original species description does not include any habitat or ecological information. Presumably, reproduction involves eggs in a nest buried in mud near water, with the tadpoles developing in the water.

Threats to this "data deficient" species are unknown.
