= Leptopelis jordani =

Conservation status
- Data Deficient (IUCN 3.1)

Scientific classification
- Kingdom: Animalia
- Phylum: Chordata
- Class: Amphibia
- Order: Anura
- Family: Arthroleptidae
- Genus: Leptopelis
- Species: L. jordani

Binomial name
- Leptopelis jordani Parker, 1936

Species of amphibian

Leptopelis jordani is a species of little-known frog in the family Arthroleptidae. Common name Congulu forest treefrog has been coined for it.

== Etymology ==
The specific name jordani honours Karl Jordan, a German entomologist. The species was described based on a specimen collected by Jordan.

== Distribution and taxonomy ==
Leptopelis jordani was described by British zoologist Hampton Wildman Parker based on a single specimen, the holotype, collected by Karl Jordan in 1934 during his expedition to Angola and Namibia. The species is still only known from its type locality, Congulu, near Gabela, western Angola. However, there are doubts as to its taxonomic validity. Parker considered it to be related to Leptopelis aubryi.

== Description ==
The holotype is an adult female measuring 62 mm (2.4 in) in snout–vent length. The head is broad with a blunt snout. The tympanum is distinct. The canthus rostralis is obtusely angular and strongly curved. Skin is smooth above but strongly granular below; there are a few granules below the ear. The limbs are short; the fingers are slightly webbed whereas the toes are nearly half-webbed. The digits have well-developed discs.

== Habitat and conservation ==
Leptopelis jordani was collected within the forest zone at an elevation of about 700–800 m (2,300–2,600 ft) above sea level. Its ecology is otherwise unknown. Its conservation status is "Data Deficient" because there is no recent information on this species.
