= Leptopelis susanae =

Conservation status
- Endangered (IUCN 3.1)

Scientific classification
- Kingdom: Animalia
- Phylum: Chordata
- Class: Amphibia
- Order: Anura
- Family: Arthroleptidae
- Genus: Leptopelis
- Species: L. susanae

Binomial name
- Leptopelis susanae Largen, 1977

Species of amphibian

Leptopelis susanae is a species of frog in the family Arthroleptidae. It is endemic to southwest Ethiopia and known from the Gughe Mountains and Saja Forest. The specific name susanae honours Susan, the wife of the describer, Malcolm Largen. Common names Susan's tree frog and Susana's [sic] forest treefrog have been coined for this species.

== Description ==
Adult males measure 32–37 mm (1.3–1.5 in) and adult females 48–53 mm (1.9–2.1 in) in snout–vent length. The habitus is relatively stocky. The snout is short, broadly rounded or truncated in profile. The eyes are conspicuously large and protruding. The tympanum is round and fairly conspicuous. Digital discs are of moderate size. The webbing between the toes and the two outermost fingers is moderate. The dorsum varies from pale grey or brown to brick red or pale to bright yellowish green. There are darker golden or grey-brown to blackish markings that usually form a pattern consisting of a mid-dorsal stripe (often bifurcating anteriorly) connected to the interorbital bar, as well as a pair of shorter dorsolateral stripes or blotches. A brown or blackish canthal stripe runs at least to the shoulder region, after which it typically breaks up into a series of large, irregular blotches. The venter is white with faint mottling.

The male advertisement call is a quiet "click" that may be accompanied by a low scream or creaking sound.

== Habitat and conservation ==
Leptopelis susanae occurs in montane forest remnants at elevations of 1,960–3,000 m (6,430–9,840 ft) above sea level; it does not occur in degraded habitats. Males call from exposed sites on stream-side vegetation about 25–150 cm (9.8–59.1 in) above the ground. Presumably, the eggs are deposited in nests on land near the water, and the tadpoles develop in the water.

Leptopelis susanae was relatively abundant common at two adjacent Gughe Mountains locations in 1975, but more recent surveys have found only few specimens. The species is threatened by forest clearance, human settlement, and agricultural encroachment. At present, only small patches of montane forest remain. It is not known to occur in any protected areas.
