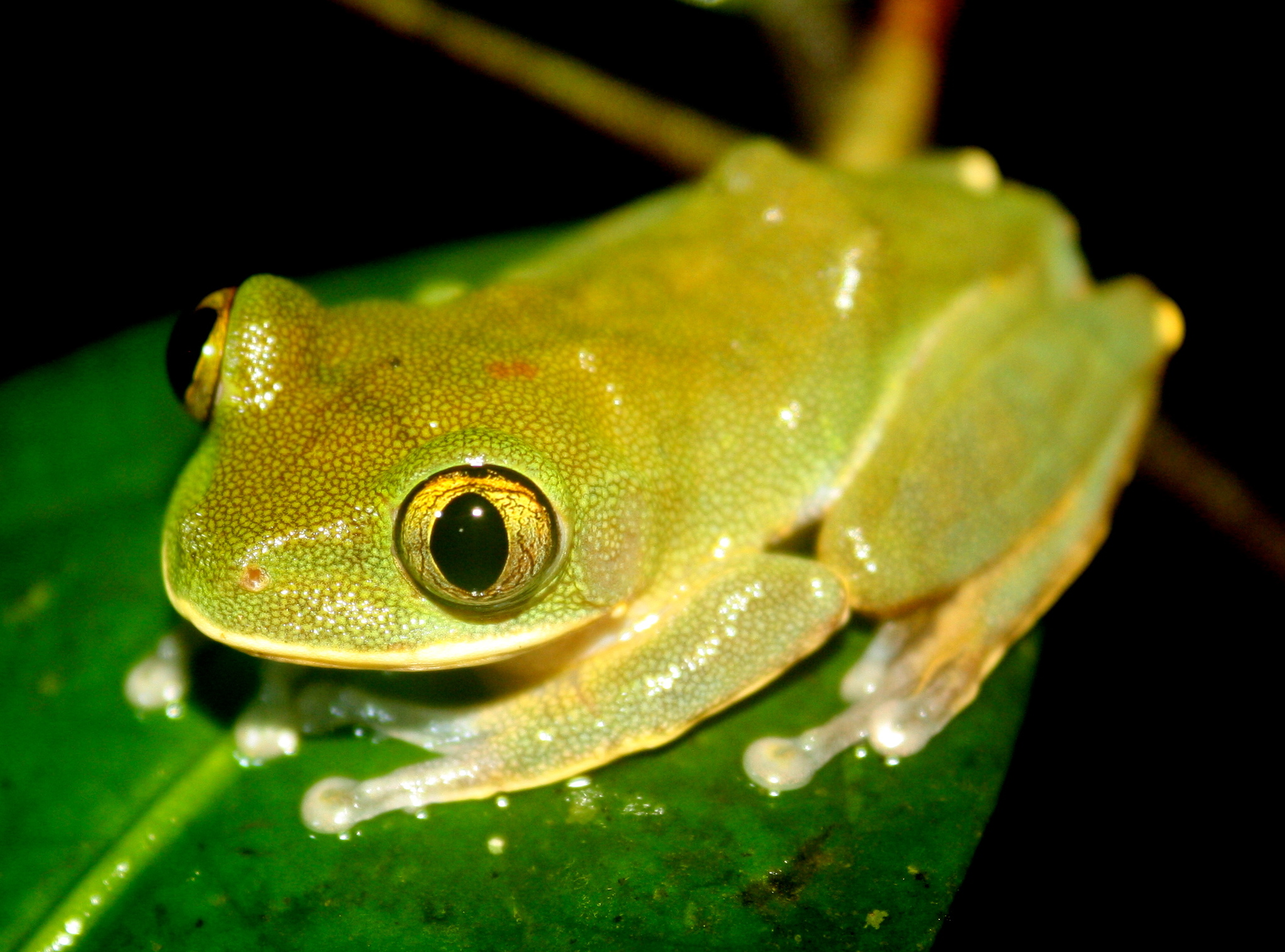

Conservation status
- Near Threatened (IUCN 3.1)

Scientific classification
- Kingdom: Animalia
- Phylum: Chordata
- Class: Amphibia
- Order: Anura
- Family: Arthroleptidae
- Genus: Leptopelis
- Species: L. occidentalis

Binomial name
- Leptopelis occidentalis Schiøtz, 1967

= Tai forest tree frog =

Species of amphibian

The Tai forest tree frog (Leptopelis occidentalis) is a species of frog in the family Arthroleptidae. It is found in Liberia, southern Ivory Coast, and Ghana. Records from Nigeria are controversial and may refer to other species, possibly Leptopelis boulengeri.

== Description ==
Males measure 36–46 mm (1.4–1.8 in) and females 49–72 mm (1.9–2.8 in) in snout–vent length. There are two colour phases. In phase A, the dorsum is green, either uniform or with minute, white spots. In phase B, the dorsum is brown and has a darker, n-shaped pattern, or in some cases, a triangular pattern, with the apex pointing forward. There is often a small whitish spot just below the eye.

Males of this species can quite often be heard calling in small groups high up in bushes and trees or large clumps of bamboo. The call is a rather soft "düt" with a very peculiar acoustical quality. The call is also described as a "typical Leptopelis clack call".

== Habitat and conservation ==
This species occurs in primary forests, and rarely, secondary forests, from near sea level to 200 m (660 ft) above sea level. It is an arboreal species. Breeding takes place in small streams and temporary ponds.

Leptopelis occidentalis is common in suitable habitat but threatened by habitat loss caused by expanding human settlements and agricultural activities (palm oil and rubber), collecting of firewood, and logging. It occurs in the Taï and Mont Sângbé National Parks. Because of the ongoing habitat loss, the International Union for Conservation of Nature (IUCN) has assessed it as a near-threatened species.
