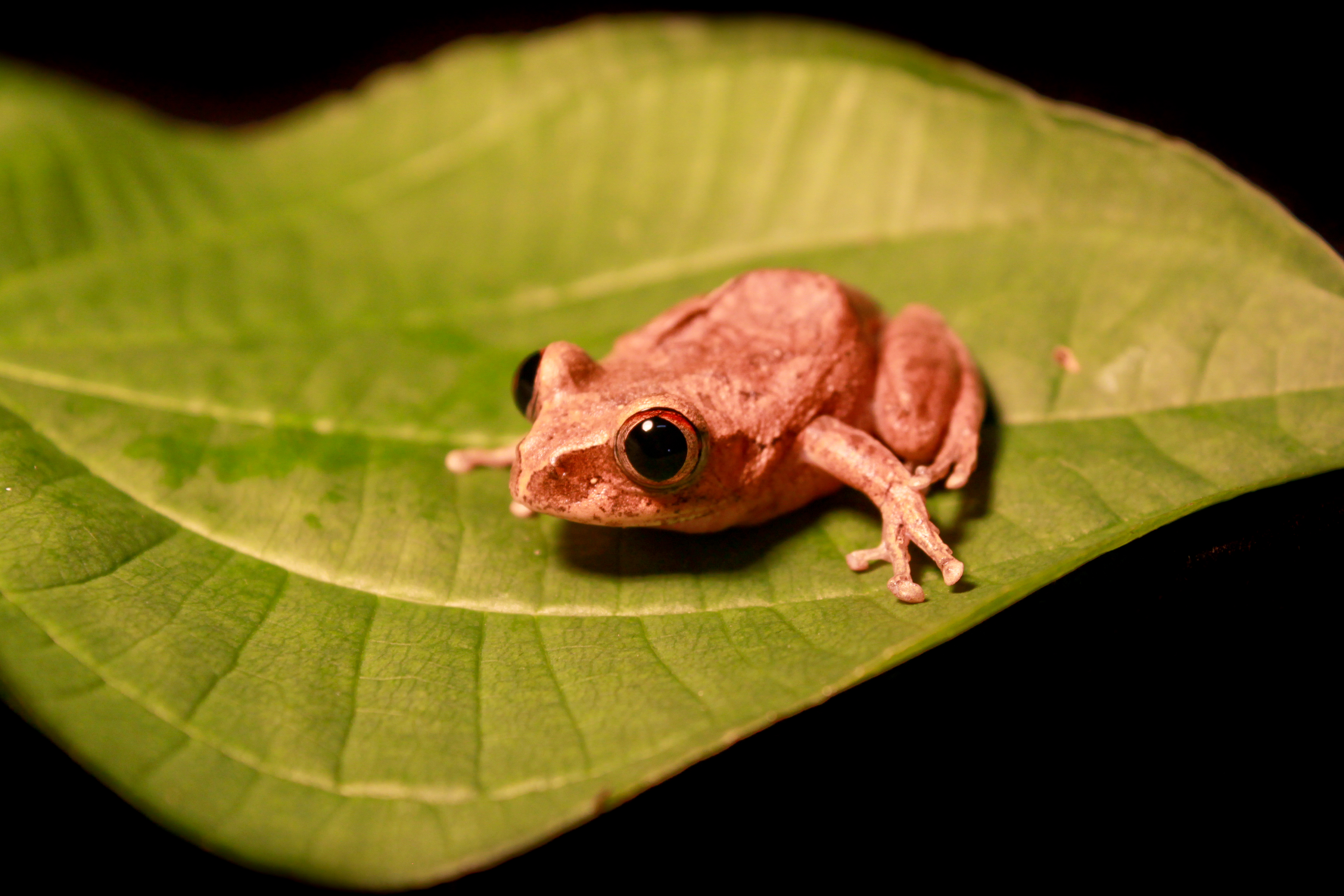
- Leptopelis aubryi, the type species

Scientific classification
- Kingdom: Animalia
- Phylum: Chordata
- Class: Amphibia
- Order: Anura
- Family: Arthroleptidae
- Subfamily: Leptopelinae; Laurent, 1972
- Genus: Leptopelis; Günther, 1859

Type species
- Hyla aubryi Duméril, 1856

Species
- 54 species (see text)

Synonyms
- Pseudocassina Ahl, 1924; Elaphromantis Laurent, 1941; Heteropelis Laurent, 1941; Taphriomantis Laurent, 1941; Habrahyla Goin, 1961

= Leptopelis =

Genus of amphibians

Leptopelis is a genus of frogs in the family Arthroleptidae. They are found throughout Sub-Saharan Africa, excluding Madagascar. It is placed in monotypic subfamily Leptopelinae, although this subfamily is not always recognized. They have a number of common names, including forest treefrogs, tree frogs, leaf-frogs, and big-eyed frogs.

== Description ==
Leptopelis are mostly medium-sized frogs (snout–vent length 26–42 mm (1.0–1.7 in)), but Leptopelis palmatus can reach 87 mm (3.4 in). Tympanum is present. Most species have expended digit tips.

== Ecology ==
Leptopelis are mainly arboreal, but some species, especially in more arid areas, are terrestrial or even subfossorial. Breeding typically starts with the heavy rains in the beginning of the wet season. Eggs may be deposited either in water or in/on the ground. Development includes a free-living tadpole stage, with a possible exception of Leptopelis brevirostris, whose large eggs suggest that development could be direct. Males typically call in bushes or trees a meter or more above the ground.

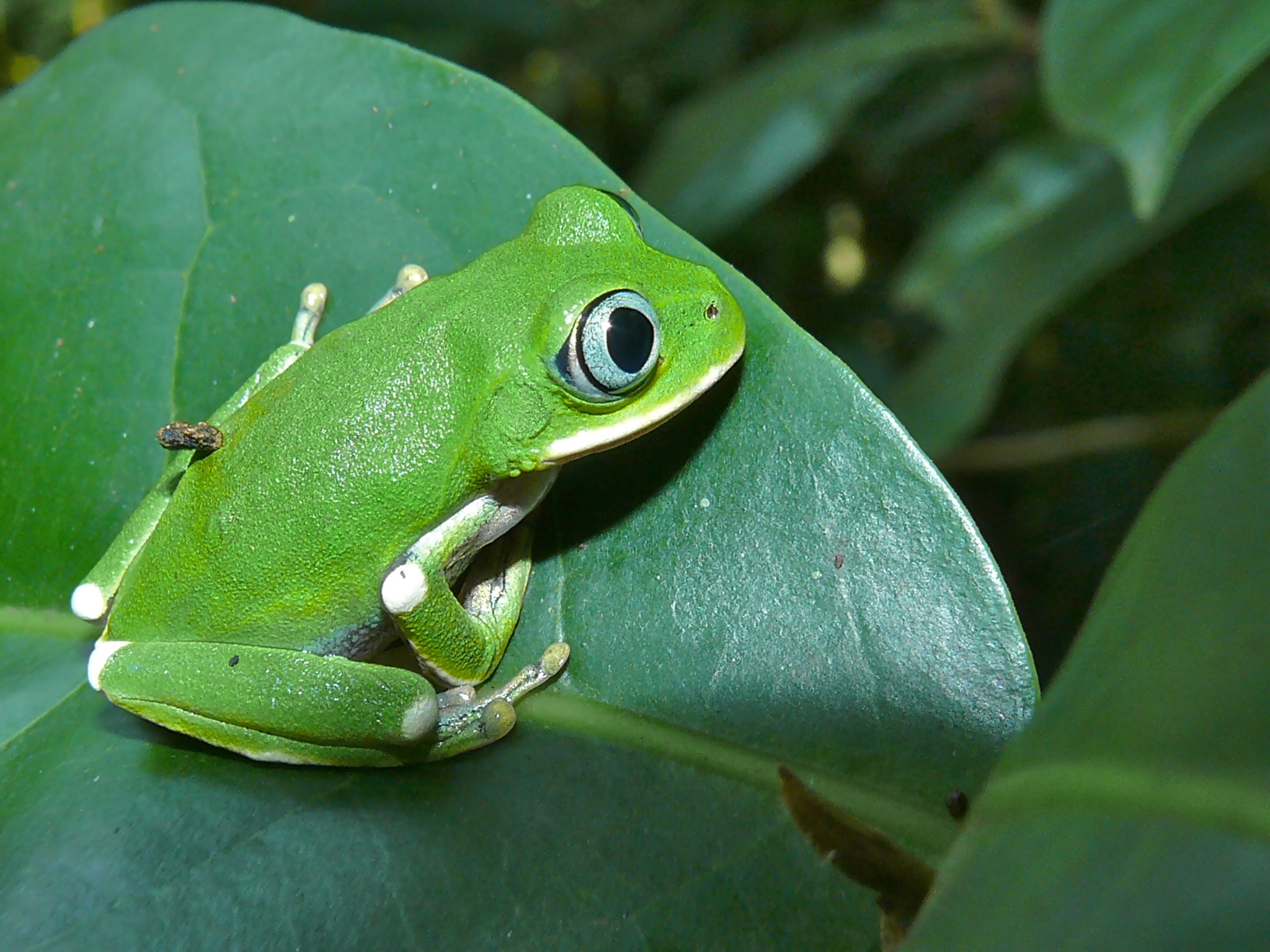
Leptopelis kivuensis

== Species ==
As of June 2026, there are 56 recognized species:

- Leptopelis anchietae (Bocage, 1873)
- Leptopelis anebos Portillo and Greenbaum, 2014
- Leptopelis argenteus (Pfeffer, 1893)
- Leptopelis aubryi (Duméril, 1856)
- Leptopelis aubryioides (Andersson, 1907)
- Leptopelis bequaerti Loveridge, 1941
- Leptopelis bocagii (Günther, 1865)
- Leptopelis boulengeri (Werner, 1898)
- Leptopelis brevirostris (Werner, 1898)
- Leptopelis broadleyi (Poynton, 1985)
- Leptopelis bufonides Schiøtz, 1967
- Leptopelis calcaratus (Boulenger, 1906)
- Leptopelis christyi (Boulenger, 1912)
- Leptopelis concolor Ahl, 1929
- Leptopelis cynnamomeus (Bocage, 1893)
- Leptopelis diffidens Tiutenko and Zinenko, 2021
- Leptopelis fenestratus Laurent, 1972
- Leptopelis fiziensis Laurent, 1973
- Leptopelis flavomaculatus (Günther, 1864)
- Leptopelis gramineus (Boulenger, 1898)
- Leptopelis grandiceps Ahl, 1929
- Leptopelis jordani Parker, 1936
- Leptopelis karissimbensis Ahl, 1929
- Leptopelis kivuensis Ahl, 1929
- Leptopelis lebeaui (De Witte, 1933)
- Leptopelis mackayi Köhler, Bwong, Schick, Veith, and Lötters, 2006
- Leptopelis macrotis Schiøtz, 1967
- Leptopelis marginatus (Bocage, 1895)
- Leptopelis millsoni (Boulenger, 1895)
- Leptopelis modestus (Werner, 1898)
- Leptopelis montanus Tiutenko and Zinenko, 2021
- Leptopelis mossambicus Poynton, 1985
- Leptopelis mtoewaate Portillo and Greenbaum, 2014
- Leptopelis natalensis (Smith, 1849)
- Leptopelis nordequatorialis Perret, 1966
- Leptopelis notatus (Peters, 1875)
- Leptopelis occidentalis Schiøtz, 1967
- Leptopelis ocellatus (Mocquard, 1902)
- Leptopelis oryi Inger, 1968
- Leptopelis palmatus (Peters, 1868)
- Leptopelis parbocagii Poynton and Broadley, 1987
- Leptopelis parkeri Barbour and Loveridge, 1928
- Leptopelis parvus Schmidt and Inger, 1959
- Leptopelis ragazzii (Boulenger, 1896)
- Leptopelis rufus Reichenow, 1874
- Leptopelis rugosus (Ahl, 1924)
- Leptopelis shebellensis Goutte, Reyes-Velasco, Kassie Teme, and Boissinot, 2022
- Leptopelis spiritusnoctis Rödel, 2007
- Leptopelis susanae Largen, 1977
- Leptopelis uluguruensis Barbour and Loveridge, 1928
- Leptopelis vannutellii (Boulenger, 1898)
- Leptopelis vermiculatus (Boulenger, 1909)
- Leptopelis viridis (Günther, 1869)
- Leptopelis xeniae Goutte, Reyes-Velasco, Kassie Teme, and Boissinot, 2022
- Leptopelis xenodactylus Poynton, 1963
- Leptopelis yaldeni Largen, 1977
- Leptopelis zebra Amiet, 2001

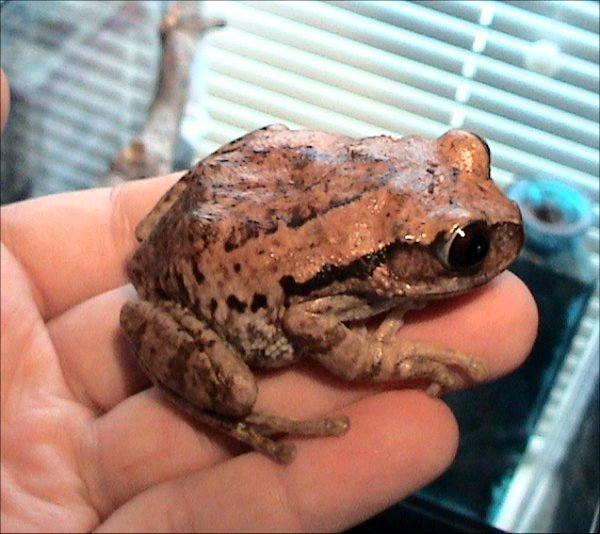
Leptopelis vermiculatus

== In captivity ==
L. vermiculatus is found in international pet trade. They are hardy frogs that adapt well to captivity, and readily consume commercially available crickets.
