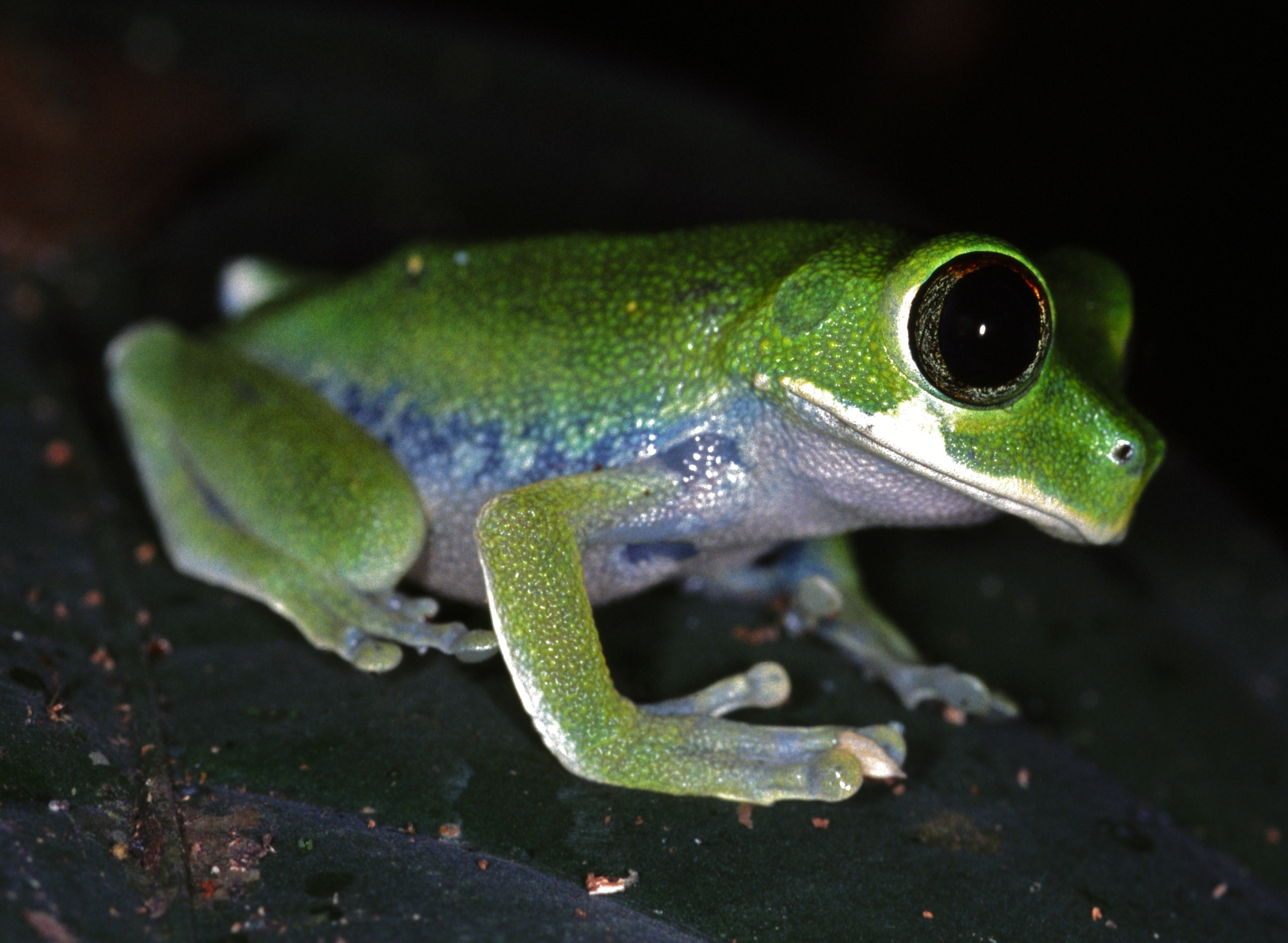

Conservation status
- Least Concern (IUCN 3.1)

Scientific classification
- Kingdom: Animalia
- Phylum: Chordata
- Class: Amphibia
- Order: Anura
- Family: Arthroleptidae
- Genus: Leptopelis
- Species: L. brevirostris

Binomial name
- Leptopelis brevirostris (Werner, 1898)

Synonyms
- Hylambates brevirostris Werner, 1898; Hylambates brevicornis Sollas, 1906; Hylambates brevipes Boulenger, 1906; Leptopelis brevipes Ahl, 1931; Leptopelis crystallinoron Lötters, Rödel, and Burger, 2005

= Cameroon forest tree frog =

Species of amphibian

The Cameroon forest tree frog (Leptopelis brevirostris) is a species of frog in the family Arthroleptidae. It is found in southern Nigeria, Cameroon, Equatorial Guinea (including the island of Bioko), and Gabon. It is expected to occur in southwestern Central African Republic and in the Republic of the Congo, but no records have been confirmed from those countries.

== Description ==
Adult males measure 38–45 mm (1.5–1.8 in) and females 49–64 mm (1.9–2.5 in) in snout–vent length. The dorsum is smooth, green, beige, or grey, and either uniform or with a darker dorsal spot reaching the upper eyelid. The ventrum is white. The snout is very brief (hence the specific name brevirostris). The tympanum is present and oriented obliquely.

=== Reproduction ===
The male advertisement call is a rather tonal, brief "tok", repeated once or twice (sometimes even three times). The males call at sites far from water (ponds or puddles). This, together with the large (diameter 5 mm (0.20 in)) and heavily yolked eggs, suggests that L. brevirostris has direct development, i.e. there is no free-living tadpole stage. This would be different from the general pattern of Leptopelis having aquatic larvae.

== Habitat and conservation ==
The species' natural habitat is mature, closed-canopy lowland rainforest. It appears to be a specialized snail-eater. The males call from branches and lianas, normally not higher than 3 metres above the ground, and can be abundant.

Leptopelis brevirostris is a common species, but its habitat is impacted by agricultural expansion, logging, and human settlements. It occurs in a number of protected areas, including the Korup National Park in Cameroon and Monte Alén National Park in Equatorial Guinea.
