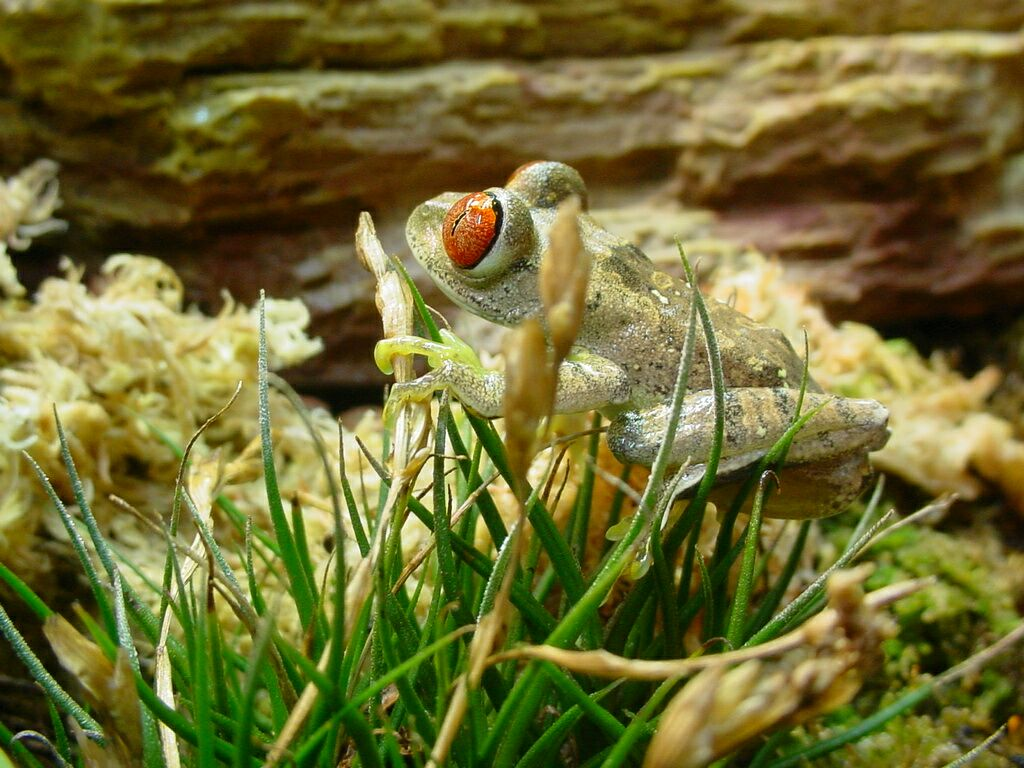

Conservation status
- Endangered (IUCN 3.1)

Scientific classification
- Kingdom: Animalia
- Phylum: Chordata
- Class: Amphibia
- Order: Anura
- Family: Arthroleptidae
- Genus: Leptopelis
- Species: L. parkeri

Binomial name
- Leptopelis parkeri Barbour and Loveridge, 1928

Synonyms
- Leptopelis martiensseni Ahl, 1929

= Leptopelis parkeri =

Species of amphibian

Leptopelis parkeri is a species of frog in the family Arthroleptidae. It is endemic to Tanzania and known from the Eastern Arc Mountains. Specifically, it has been recorded from Uluguru, Udzungwa, East and West Usambara, Nguru, and South Pare Mountains. Common names Parker's tree frog and Parker's forest treefrog have been coined for it. It is named after Hampton Wildman Parker, a British zoologist and herpetologist from the Natural History Museum, London.

== Description ==
Adult males measure 34–43 mm (1.3–1.7 in) and adult females at least 56 mm (2.2 in) in snout–vent length. The tympanum is small. The fingers and toes have extensive webbing. The eyes are bright red, which is a diagnostic character. Males have grey to brown or olive green dorsum, with a conspicuous yellowish pattern, generally forming irregular transverse bands. In contrast, females have a uniform olive-green dorsum. The throat is white in males but orange in females. The flanks, the ventral sides of limbs, and the toes are yellow-orange. The venter is whitish.

== Habitat and conservation ==
Leptopelis parkeri occurs in good-quality forests at elevations of 300–2,000 m (980–6,560 ft) above sea level. Reproduction probably involves terrestrial eggs and aquatic larvae. It is a locally common species. It is threatened by habitat loss and degradation caused by encroaching small-scale agriculture, selective logging, and fire. It occurs in may protected areas.
