= Leptopelis fiziensis =

Conservation status
- Data Deficient (IUCN 3.1)

Scientific classification
- Kingdom: Animalia
- Phylum: Chordata
- Class: Amphibia
- Order: Anura
- Family: Arthroleptidae
- Genus: Leptopelis
- Species: L. fiziensis

Binomial name
- Leptopelis fiziensis Laurent, 1973

Synonyms
- Leptopelis modestus fiziensis Laurent, 1973; Leptopelis fiziensis – Schiøtz, 1975

Species of amphibian

Leptopelis fiziensis, also known as the Mokanga forest tree frog or Fizi tree frog, is a species of frog in the family Arthroleptidae. It is known from the Democratic Republic of the Congo and Tanzania, on both sides of Lake Tanganyika, and it is likely to occur in Burundi, in between the two known areas of distribution.

== Distribution and taxonomy ==
Leptopelis fiziensis was first described as a subspecies of Leptopelis modestus, based on specimens from the Fizi Territory in the eastern Democratic Republic of the Congo. Later on it has also been recorded in western Tanzania. However, recent molecular work suggests that its closest relative is Leptopelis karissimbensis rather than Leptopelis modestus. Moreover, some of the Tanzanian records might refer to another species.

== Description ==
Adult males measure 30–38 mm (1.2–1.5 in) and females, based on a single specimen, 46 mm (1.8 in) in snout–vent length. The tympanum is small. Digital discs are large. The dorsum is red-brown to brown, with darker patterning and tiny light specks. The ventrum is greyish while the femurs are reddish. The iris is golden. Males have a greyish throat.

The male advertisement call is a series of two or three clacks/pulses sounding like "quack-quack".

== Habitat and conservation ==
Leptopelis fiziensis have been found in transitional forest in the forest-savanna mosaic, near a stream at the edge of montane forest, and dense low bush at the edge of a clearing in dry forest. There is also a record from riverine forest within pristine miombo woodland, but this might refer to another species. They are typically found on shrubs and trees some 1–3 m (3 ft 3 in – 9 ft 10 in) above the ground. The altitudinal range is 1,170–1,950 m (3,840–6,400 ft) above sea level.

Threats to this species are unknown. It occurs in the Gombe Stream National Park, Tanzania.
