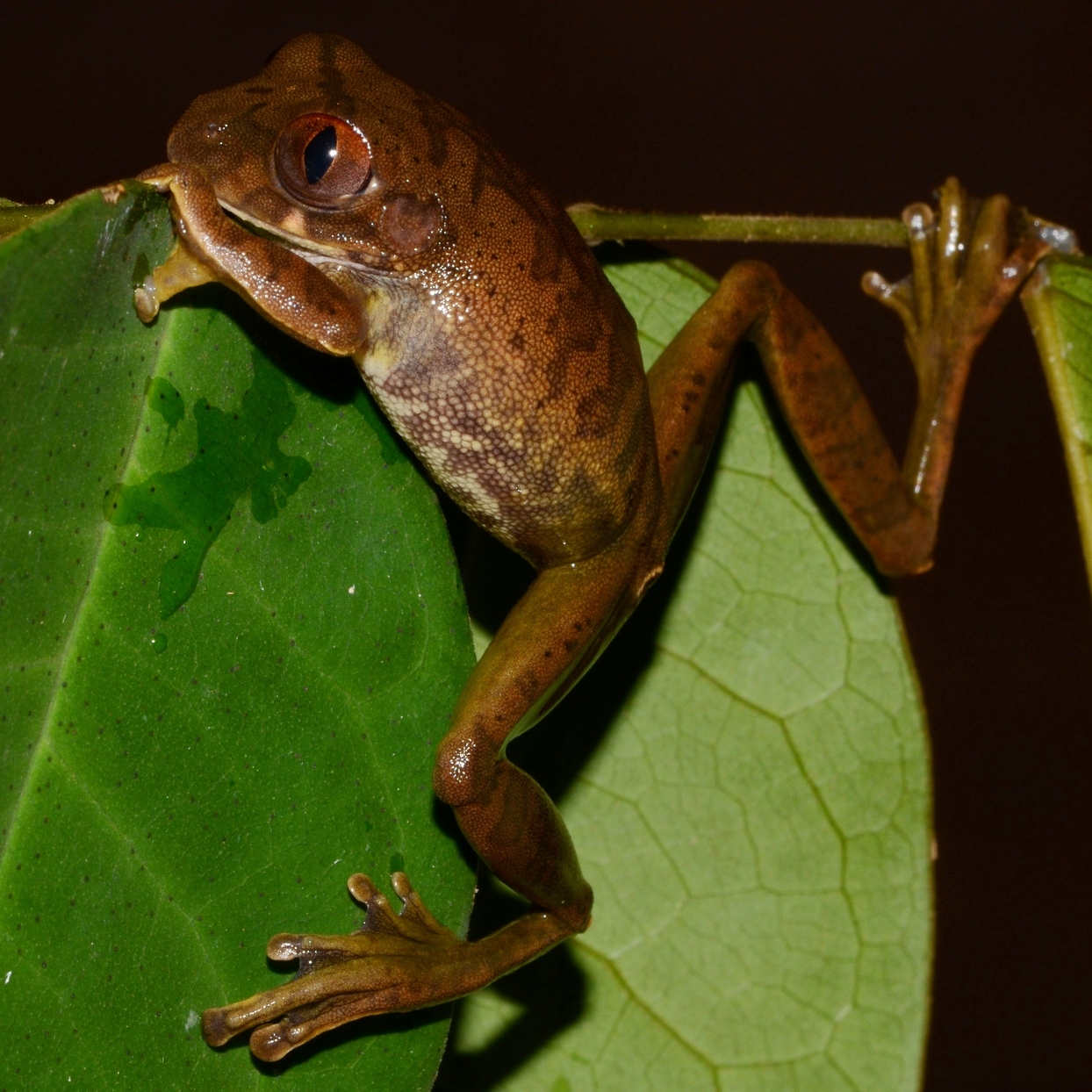

Conservation status
- Least Concern (IUCN 3.1)

Scientific classification
- Kingdom: Animalia
- Phylum: Chordata
- Class: Amphibia
- Order: Anura
- Family: Arthroleptidae
- Genus: Leptopelis
- Species: L. boulengeri

Binomial name
- Leptopelis boulengeri (Werner, 1898)

Synonyms
- Hylambates rufus var. boulengeri Werner, 1898; Leptopelis poensis Ahl, 1929; Leptopelis violescens Ahl, 1929; Leptopelis flaviventer Ahl, 1929

= Leptopelis boulengeri =

Species of frog

Leptopelis boulengeri is a species of frog in the family Arthroleptidae. It is found in southeastern Nigeria, southern Cameroon, Equatorial Guinea (including the island of Bioko), Gabon, Republic of the Congo, and western Democratic Republic of the Congo. It is expected to be found in the Central African Republic and the Cabinda Enclave of Angola. The common name Victoria forest treefrog has been coined for it, apparently in reference to its type locality, "Victoria, Kamerun", now known as Limbe.

== Etymology ==
The specific name boulengeri honours George Albert Boulenger, a Belgian-British zoologist who described many new animal species, including fish, reptiles, and amphibians.

== Description ==
Adult males measure 37–48 mm (1.5–1.9 in) and females 60–81 mm (2.4–3.2 in) in snout–vent length. The dorsum is brown, or less commonly, green. The brown specimens have a dark bar between the eyes and a dorsal, forward-pointing triangle. These markings are occasionally replaced by dorsal spots. There is a conspicuous white spot below eye. The canthus rostralis is angular.

== Habitat and conservation ==
Leptopelis boulengeri is an arboreal species; the males are often heard calling from branches and lianas in dense rainforest, sometimes as high as 5–6 m above the ground. The species does not occur in secondary habitats. The eggs are laid in underground nests near streams.

Leptopelis boulengeri is a common species, but agricultural expansion, logging, and increasing human settlements are impacting its forest habitat. It occurs in a number of protected areas, including the Korup National Park (Cameroon) and Monte Alén National Park (Equatorial Guinea).
