= Leptopelis zebra =

Conservation status
- Least Concern (IUCN 3.1)

Scientific classification
- Kingdom: Animalia
- Phylum: Chordata
- Class: Amphibia
- Order: Anura
- Family: Arthroleptidae
- Genus: Leptopelis
- Species: L. zebra

Binomial name
- Leptopelis zebra Amiet, 2001

Species of frog

Leptopelis zebra is a species of frog in the family Arthroleptidae. It is found in southern Cameroon south of Sanaga River and in Gabon.

== Description ==
Adult males measure 29–38 mm (1.1–1.5 in) and adult females 45 mm (1.8 in) in snout–vent length. The canthus rostralis is rounded and indistinct. The dorsum has transverse dark bands. The venter is unspotted. The male advertisement call is a series of 3–4 deep, slow "hon" sounds, the last of which is more sonorous than the others. It may also emit a nasal, deep "konk" sound.

== Habitat and conservation ==
Leptopelis zebra occurs in lowland rainforest in flat-bottomed valleys with slow-flowing streams. In Cameroon it has been recorded from 720 m (2,360 ft) above sea level, somewhat lower in Gabon. During the rainy season, they are found on the ground with puddles and water holes. Breeding takes place in standing water and marshes. Presumably, the eggs are deposited in nests on land, near water.

Leptopelis zebra is an uncommon species that is probably threatened by habitat loss caused by agricultural development, logging, and human settlements. Specimens from the Crystal Mountains and Ivindo National Parks tested negative for the pathogenic fungus Batrachochytrium dendrobatidis.
