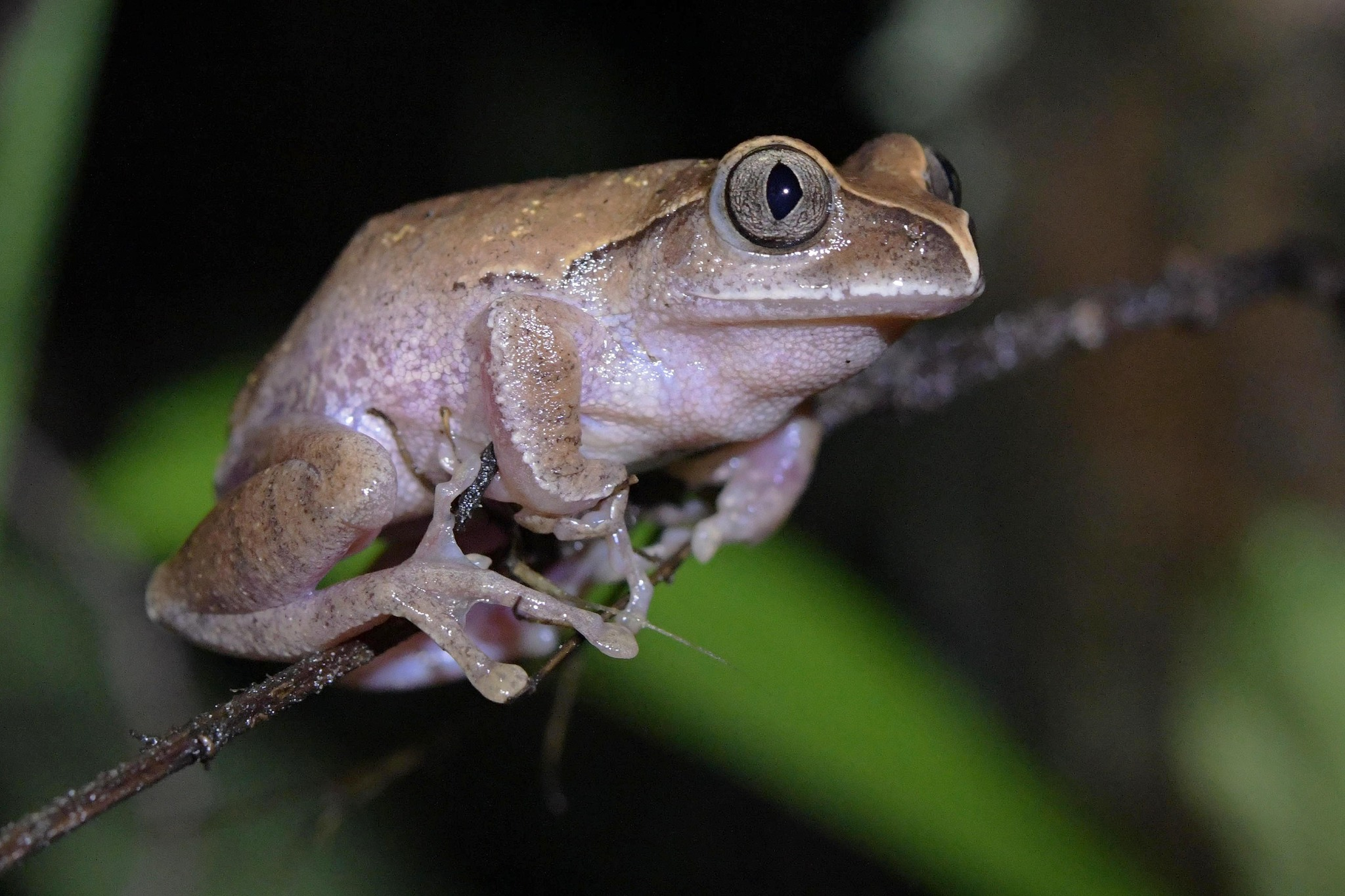

Conservation status
- Least Concern (IUCN 3.1)

Scientific classification
- Kingdom: Animalia
- Phylum: Chordata
- Class: Amphibia
- Order: Anura
- Family: Arthroleptidae
- Genus: Leptopelis
- Species: L. cynnamomeus

Binomial name
- Leptopelis cynnamomeus (Bocage, 1893)

Synonyms
- Leptopelis moeroensis Laurent, 1973

= Angola forest tree frog =

Species of amphibian

The Angola forest tree frog (Leptopelis cynnamomeus), is a species of frog in the family Arthroleptidae found in an area from southern Democratic Republic of the Congo and north-western Zambia to central Angola. It is a common frog found in gallery forests, dry forests and well-wooded humid savanna.
