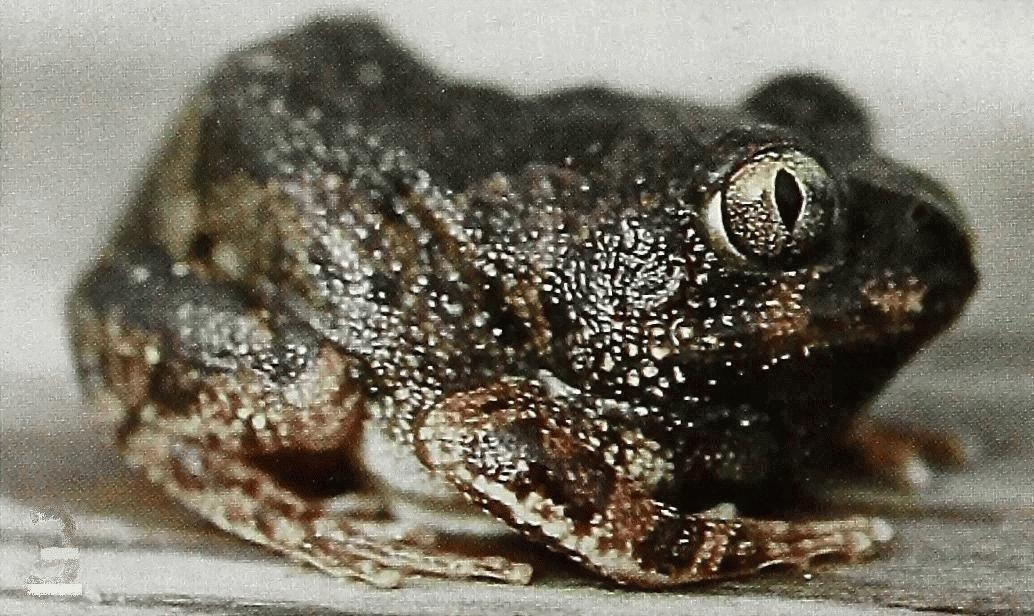

Conservation status
- Least Concern (IUCN 3.1)

Scientific classification
- Kingdom: Animalia
- Phylum: Chordata
- Class: Amphibia
- Order: Anura
- Family: Arthroleptidae
- Genus: Leptopelis
- Species: L. bufonides

Binomial name
- Leptopelis bufonides Schiøtz, 1967

= Savannah forest tree frog =

Species of amphibian

The savannah forest tree frog or ground tree frog (Leptopelis bufonides) is a species of frog in the family Arthroleptidae. It occurs in West and Middle Africa. The relationship of this species with Leptopelis bocagei is not fully settled.

== Distribution ==
Leptopelis bufonides is known from Senegal, the Gambia, Burkina Faso, northern Ghana, Togo, northern Benin, northern Nigeria, northern Cameroon, and southern Chad. Its range may extend to several other African countries (e.g., Guinea, Guinea-Bissau, Mali, Ivory Coast and Niger), although specimens have not been confirmed elsewhere.

== Description ==
Leptopelis bufonides is a small, toad-like frog, with males measuring 29–33 mm (1.1–1.3 in) and females 37–41 mm (1.5–1.6 in) in snout–vent length. The dorsum is brown and shows a darker, backward-pointing, triangle-like pattern on the head, and an 'n' shaped pattern combined with a few mid-dorsal spots. Skin is warty. The legs are short, and the toes have only rudiments of webbing.

The male advertisement call is a "clack" that is deeper and more atonal than the calls of other West African Leptopelis.

== Habitat and conservation ==
This species lives in dry open savanna and grassland. It is probably fossorial, spending large parts of the year underground. Reproduction takes place in flooded meadows. Males call from the ground, concealed in low grass or shallow water. The eggs are laid in a burrow in loamy soil.

Leptopelis bufonides appears to be a very uncommon species that is known only from few records across its vast mapped range. It is not known to what degree this is because of the paucity of herpetological surveys in the area, its secretive habits, or genuinely patchy distribution. It is unlikely to face any major threats.
