= Zaire forest tree frog =

Conservation status
- Data Deficient (IUCN 3.1)

Scientific classification
- Kingdom: Animalia
- Phylum: Chordata
- Class: Amphibia
- Order: Anura
- Family: Arthroleptidae
- Genus: Leptopelis
- Species: L. fenestratus

Binomial name
- Leptopelis fenestratus Laurent, 1972

Species of amphibian

The Zaire forest tree frog (Leptopelis fenestratus) is a species of frog in the family Arthroleptidae endemic to the Democratic Republic of the Congo. Its natural habitats are rivers, freshwater marshes, and intermittent freshwater marshes.
