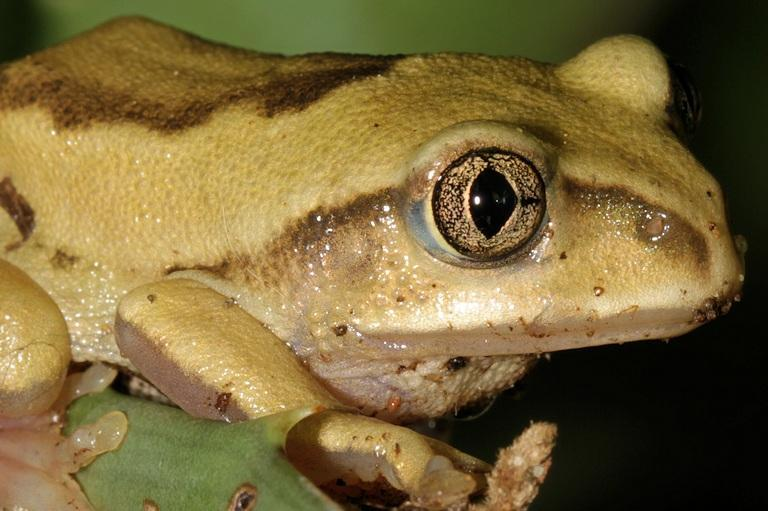

Conservation status
- Least Concern (IUCN 3.1)

Scientific classification
- Kingdom: Animalia
- Phylum: Chordata
- Class: Amphibia
- Order: Anura
- Family: Arthroleptidae
- Genus: Leptopelis
- Species: L. mossambicus

Binomial name
- Leptopelis mossambicus Poynton, 1985

= Mozambique forest tree frog =

Species of amphibian

Leptopelis mossambicus, the brown-backed tree frog, Mozambique tree frog or Mossambique forest treefrog, is a species of frog in the family Arthroleptidae found in Eswatini, Malawi, Mozambique, South Africa, Zimbabwe, and possibly Botswana. Its natural habitats are dry savanna, moist savanna, subtropical or tropical moist shrubland, subtropical or tropical dry lowland grasslands, subtropical or tropical seasonally wet or flooded lowland grasslands, swamps, freshwater marshes, and intermittent freshwater marshes. It is threatened by habitat loss.
