= Leptopelis anebos =

Conservation status
- Endangered (IUCN 3.1)

Scientific classification
- Kingdom: Animalia
- Phylum: Chordata
- Class: Amphibia
- Order: Anura
- Family: Arthroleptidae
- Genus: Leptopelis
- Species: L. anebos

Binomial name
- Leptopelis anebos Portillo & Greenbaum, 2014

Species of frog

Leptopelis anebos, the young Itombwe forest treefrog, is a frog in the genus Leptopelis found in the Democratic Republic of the Congo and Congo. It was scientifically described in 2014 by Portillo & Greenbaum.

== Description ==
Leptopelis karissimbensis is the closest living relative to Leptopelis anebos. Compared to other members of its genus, Leptopelis anebos has a relatively wide head, long and large eyes, curved snout, and partially webbed limbs. Nodule-like projections are found on its back and it has sexually dimorphic pectoral glands. Males have a light underside and brown markings on a beige colored back. Underneath the eye, a distinctive mark is visible. During the breeding season, males emit a single and short, sharp sound.

== Geographic distribution and threats ==
Inland, Leptopelis anebos inhabits forests, grasslands and wetlands in one to four locations. Specimens have been found in elevations of 1,897 to 2,227 m (6,224 to 7,306 ft) in the Itombwe Plateau, Democratic Republic of Congo. As of 2015, it is listed as Endangered by the IUCN Red List, with a decreasing population trend. Habitat destruction is the main threat to the species.
