= Ocellated forest tree frog =

Conservation status
- Least Concern (IUCN 3.1)

Scientific classification
- Kingdom: Animalia
- Phylum: Chordata
- Class: Amphibia
- Order: Anura
- Family: Arthroleptidae
- Genus: Leptopelis
- Species: L. ocellatus

Binomial name
- Leptopelis ocellatus (Mocquard, 1902)

Species of amphibian

The ocellated forest tree frog (Leptopelis ocellatus) is a species of frog in the family Arthroleptidae found in Cameroon, the Republic of the Congo, the Democratic Republic of the Congo, Equatorial Guinea, and Gabon, and possibly Angola and the Central African Republic. Its natural habitats are subtropical or tropical moist lowland forest, swamps, and heavily degraded former forests. It is threatened by habitat loss.
