= Leptopelis parbocagii =

Conservation status
- Least Concern (IUCN 3.1)

Scientific classification
- Kingdom: Animalia
- Phylum: Chordata
- Class: Amphibia
- Order: Anura
- Family: Arthroleptidae
- Genus: Leptopelis
- Species: L. parbocagii

Binomial name
- Leptopelis parbocagii Poynton and Broadley, 1987

Species of amphibian

Leptopelis parbocagii, also known as Lake Upemba forest treefrog or cryptic tree frog, is a species of frog in the family Arthroleptidae. It is found in Angola, the Democratic Republic of the Congo, Malawi, Mozambique, Tanzania, and Zambia. The specific name parbocagii refers to its similarity to Leptopelis bocagii (Bocage's tree frog).

== Description ==
Leptopelis parbocagii is a large species that burrows during part of the year, with males growing to a length of 54 mm (2.1 in). The upper parts are brown, with a darker brown patch on the back extending as far as the head, or a dark M- or N-shaped mark on the back. Juvenile frogs are green, and have a white-tipped snout with a narrow black line running along the side. It is similar in appearance to Leptopelis bocagii, and their ranges overlap in some locations; there are no clear defining characteristics to separate the two species, but it may be that they occupy different ecological niches. The call of the male, uttered from the ground, a low branch, reeds or bushes, is an atonal "waaab".

== Distribution and habitat ==
Leptopelis parbocagii is native to northern Angola, southern Democratic Republic of Congo, northern Malawi, northern Mozambique, southwestern Tanzania and northern Zambia. Its natural habitat is moist upland wooded savanna, but it seems to be able to adapt to live on farmland. The limits of the distribution are uncertain because of the difficulty of distinguishing this species from Leptopelis bocagii.

== Ecology ==
Leptopelis parbocagii breed in flooded pasture where the eggs are believed to be laid in a nest near permanent water to which the tadpoles make their way.

== Status ==
Leptopelis parbocagii is a common species with a wide range, is able to adapt to new habitats, and faces no particular threats. For these reasons, the International Union for Conservation of Nature (IUCN) has assessed its conservation status as "least concern".
