= Leptopelis parvus =

Conservation status
- Data Deficient (IUCN 3.1)

Scientific classification
- Kingdom: Animalia
- Phylum: Chordata
- Class: Amphibia
- Order: Anura
- Family: Arthroleptidae
- Genus: Leptopelis
- Species: L. parvus

Binomial name
- Leptopelis parvus Schmidt and Inger, 1959
- Leptopelis parvus is only known from the Upemba National Park in southern Democratic Republic of the Congo.

Species of amphibian

Leptopelis parvus, also known as the Kanole forest treefrog, is a species of frog in the family Arthroleptidae. It is endemic to the Democratic Republic of the Congo and is only known from the Upemba National Park (Katanga Province, southern DRC).

== Description ==
Adult males measure 27–32 mm (1.1–1.3 in) and adult females 45–48 mm (1.8–1.9 in) in snout–vent length. The overall appearance is stocky. The snout is obtuse. The tympanum is distinct. The fingers have no webbing whereas the toes have reduced webbing. The finger discs are distinct but small. Alcohol-preserved specimens are dorsally uniformly brown, without white line above the anus or along outer edges of the limbs. Males have a paired subgular vocal sac.

== Habitat and conservation ==
Leptopelis parvus is known from elevations between 700–1,300 m (2,300–4,300 ft) above sea level and is probably associated with savanna woodlands. If similar to other Leptopelis, the eggs are laid in a nest buried in mud near water, into which the larvae emerge and develop.

There is no information on threats to this poorly known species. It occurs in an area of low human impact and is unlikely to be threatened. It occurs within the Upemba National Park, a protected area.
