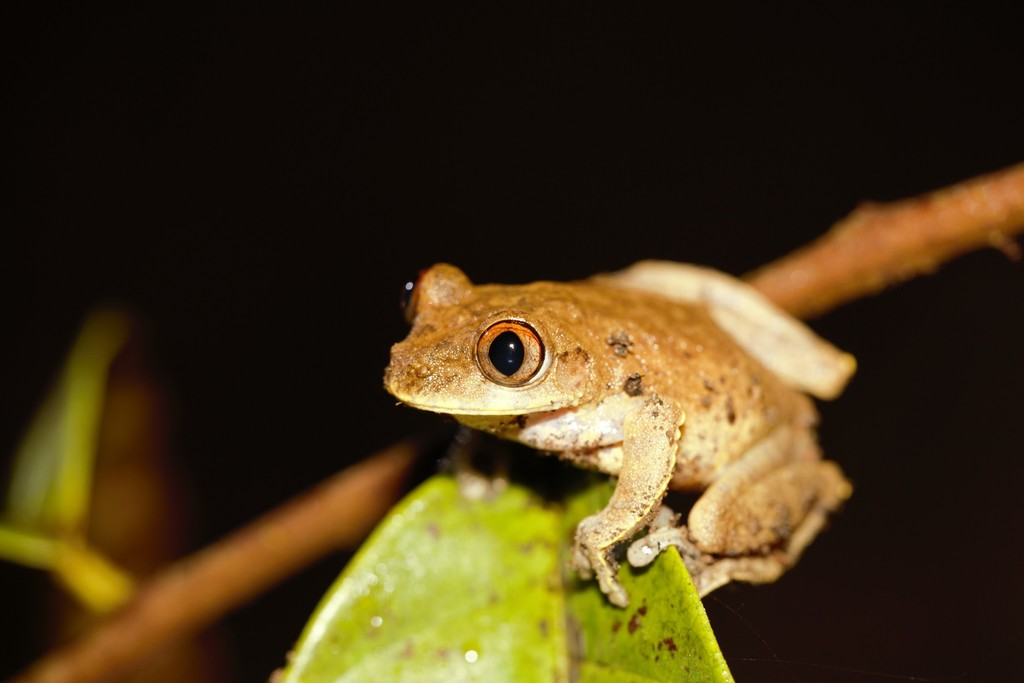

Conservation status
- Least Concern (IUCN 3.1)

Scientific classification
- Kingdom: Animalia
- Phylum: Chordata
- Class: Amphibia
- Order: Anura
- Family: Arthroleptidae
- Genus: Leptopelis
- Species: L. aubryioides

Binomial name
- Leptopelis aubryioides (Andersson, 1907)

Synonyms
- Hylambates rufus var. aubryioides Anderson, 1907; Leptopelis omissus Amiet, 1992

= Leptopelis aubryioides =

Species of frog

Leptopelis aubryioides, the Kala forest treefrog or false Aubry's tree frog, is a species of frog from the Leptopelis genus of the Arthroleptidae family. It is native to west equatorial Africa, where its range includes southern Cameroon, southern Republic of the Congo (RotC), Gabon, and southeastern Nigeria. It was shown to be abundant in a 2016 population study in these areas, but this is not the full extent of its range. It inhabits both dense lowland old-growth and open secondary forest around inland waters, near where its eggs are laid in ground-level nests. The species occurs at elevations of up to 1,000 m (3,300 ft).

As a species it appears somewhat tolerant of disturbed environments but will not inhabit forests where the understorey has been cleared. Given its relative adaptability and the large numbers recorded, IUCN classify it as a species of Least Concern, believing it to be also well established in suitable habitats throughout a range that would include Equatorial Guinea, southwestern Central African Republic (CAR), western Democratic Republic of Congo (DRC) and in the Cabinda Exclave of Angola. Despite its abundance and wide distribution, a population decline has been seen due to habitat loss.

Individuals reach lengths of 38 to 43 mm (1.5 to 1.7 in) for females and 29 to 36 mm (1.1 to 1.4 in) for males. It has a short snout and an enlarged heel spur. The species is brown in color.
