= Nyonga forest tree frog =

Conservation status
- Data Deficient (IUCN 3.1)

Scientific classification
- Kingdom: Animalia
- Phylum: Chordata
- Class: Amphibia
- Order: Anura
- Family: Arthroleptidae
- Genus: Leptopelis
- Species: L. lebeaui

Binomial name
- Leptopelis lebeaui Witte, 1933

Species of amphibian

The Nyonga forest tree frog (Leptopelis lebeaui) is a species of frog in the family Arthroleptidae endemic to the Democratic Republic of the Congo. Its natural habitats are rivers, freshwater marshes, and intermittent freshwater marshes. As of 2004, the Upemba National Park was the only place in which they were being protected.

== Conservation status ==
The conservation status of the Nyonga forest tree frog is currently data deficient, meaning not enough information is available for a proper assessment of its conservation status.
