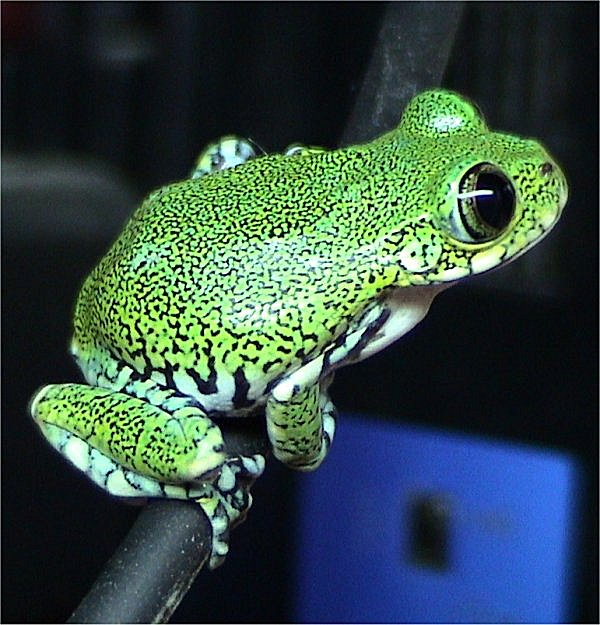

Conservation status
- Endangered (IUCN 3.1)

Scientific classification
- Kingdom: Animalia
- Phylum: Chordata
- Class: Amphibia
- Order: Anura
- Family: Arthroleptidae
- Genus: Leptopelis
- Species: L. vermiculatus

Binomial name
- Leptopelis vermiculatus (Boulenger, 1909)

Synonyms
- Hylambates vermiculatus Boulenger, 1909; Leptopelis signifer Ahl, 1929

= Leptopelis vermiculatus =

Species of amphibian

Leptopelis vermiculatus, also known as the peacock tree frog, Amani forest treefrog, or vermiculated tree frog, is a species of frog found in forest areas in Tanzania. Sometimes the common name big-eyed tree frog is used, but this may also refer to another species, Leptopelis macrotis.

== Description ==
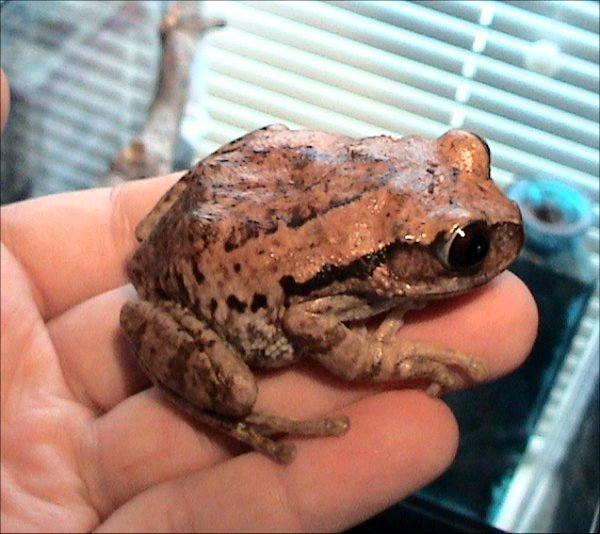
A brown-phase Leptopelis vermiculatus

This species is a medium to large frog ranging from 40 to 85 mm in length. It has two very different colour phases. In one phase, they are a bright green with scattered black specks all over the dorsal surface and the sides are marble with black and white. With some specimens, the end of the tibia to the toes, forearms and upper lip have white blotching outlined with dark green or black. In the other phase, they are brown with an irregular-shaped, darker brown triangular patch on the dorsum. Randomly placed darker or lighter brown spots and patches may appear over the dorsal surface, legs and forearms and a dark brown streak often runs from behind the tympanum ending halfway between the armpit and groin. In both phases, the ventral surface is cream-white. Some specimens show a transition between both phases and change from the green phase to the brown phase as they mature. The eyes are very big compared with body size and are golden with brown lines and flecks. Its large toe pads are used for climbing. The tympanum is distinct. They are sometimes kept as pets.

== Ecology and behaviour ==
This species inhabits the closed-canopy wet tropical rainforests of Tanzania between the altitudes of 900 and 1800 m. Males call while in the water, and are very territorial. They have two different calls: one is a “ga…ga…ga”, used for attracting females, and the other is a “rrrrrrrr-ga” used for deterring other males of the same species. They are insectivorous.

== Similar species ==
This species is very similar to the yellow-spotted tree frog (Leptopelis flavomaculatus), a species that also varies greatly in dorsal patterning and colouration. The yellow-spotted tree frog, in its green phase, lacks the fine black specks present over the dorsum in the big-eyed tree frog's green phase. The brown phase of the yellow-spotted tree frog has a white blotch on the elbow, which brown-phase big-eyed tree frogs lack.
