= Leptopelis bequaerti =

Conservation status
- Data Deficient (IUCN 3.1)

Scientific classification
- Kingdom: Animalia
- Phylum: Chordata
- Class: Amphibia
- Order: Anura
- Family: Arthroleptidae
- Genus: Leptopelis
- Species: L. bequaerti

Binomial name
- Leptopelis bequaerti Loveridge, 1941

Species of amphibian

Leptopelis bequaerti is a species of frog in the family Arthroleptidae. It is endemic to Liberia and only known from its type locality, Gbarnga, and from Mount Coffee. Common name Gbanga forest treefrog has been coined for it. It is a poorly known species with uncertain taxonomic validity.

== Etymology ==
The specific name bequaerti honours Joseph Charles Bequaert, a Belgian botanist, entomologist, and malacologist who collected the holotype.

== Description ==
Adult females measure 29–38 mm (1.1–1.5 in) and a single adult male 29 mm (1.1 in) in snout–vent length. A newly metamorphosed juvenile measured 15 mm (0.6 in). The snout is rounded. The tympanum is visible. The fingers are relatively long and bear large discs but only rudimentary webbing. The toes bear discs that are slightly smaller than the finger ones. The toes are two-thirds webbed. Skin of the dorsum is shagreened and bears small scattered warts. Colouration is pale brown above with a dark triangular interorbital marking. There is often a connected hourglass like pattern further back. A dark line runs from the eye, over the tympanum, and to the base of the forearm. The flanks are marbled. The limbs have dark crossbars. The ventrum is creamy white, possibly with sparse, brown mottling.

== Habitat and conservation ==
The habitat of this species is unknown, although it presumably breeds in temporary waterbodies where its tadpoles would develop. Threats to this species are unknown, as is its possible presence in protected areas.
