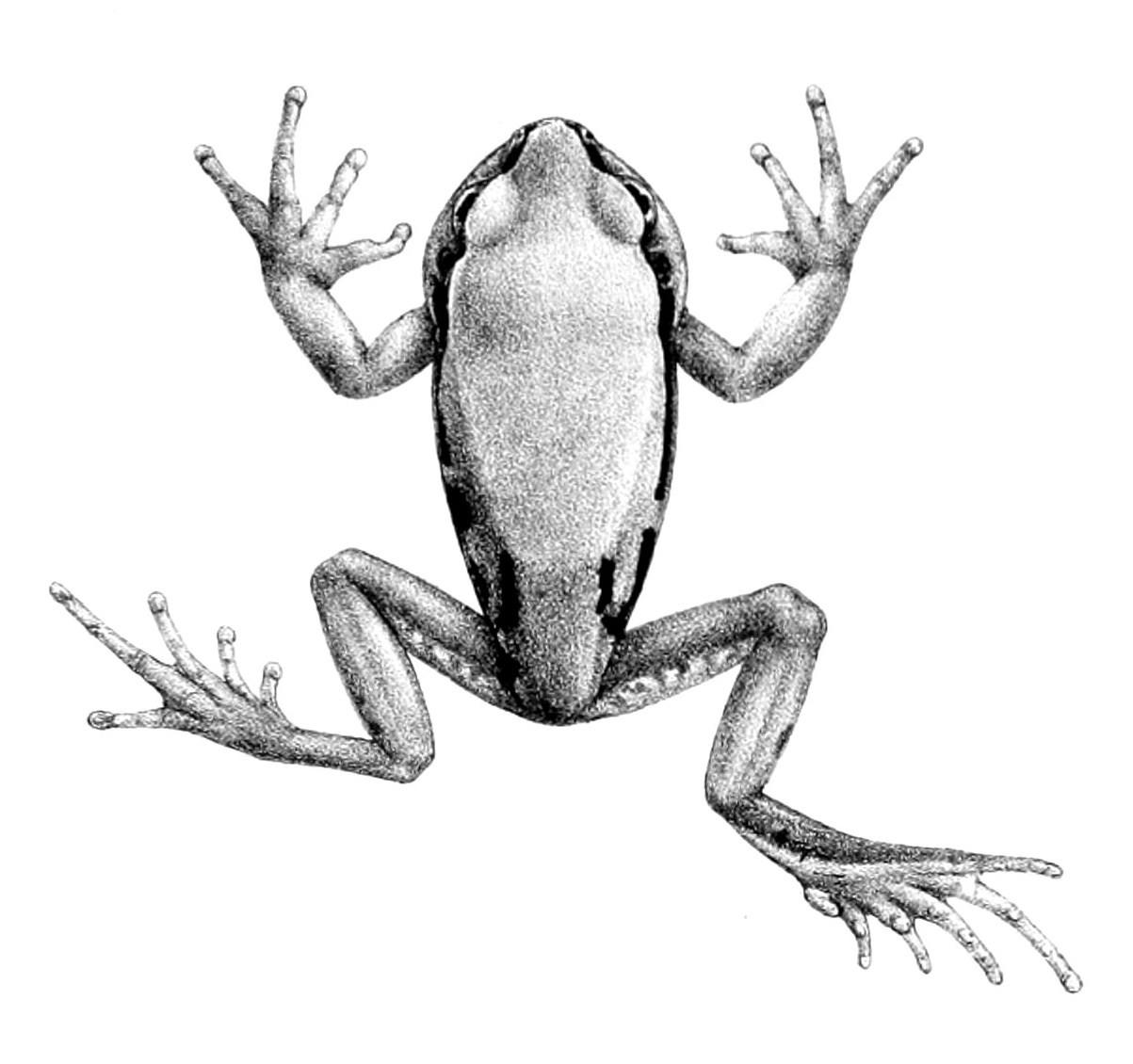

Conservation status
- Least Concern (IUCN 3.1)

Scientific classification
- Kingdom: Animalia
- Phylum: Chordata
- Class: Amphibia
- Order: Anura
- Family: Arthroleptidae
- Genus: Leptopelis
- Species: L. gramineus

Binomial name
- Leptopelis gramineus (Boulenger, 1898)

Synonyms
- Megalixalus gramineus Boulenger, 1898; Pseudocassina ocellata Ahl, 1924; Pseudocassina rugosa Ahl, 1924; Leptopelis rugosus (Ahl, 1924)

= Leptopelis gramineus =

Species of amphibian

Leptopelis gramineus is a species of frog in the family Arthroleptidae. It is endemic to Ethiopia and occurs on the Ethiopian Highlands on both sides of the Great Rift Valley. Common names Badditu forest treefrog and Ethiopian burrowing tree frog have been coined for it.

== Description ==
Adult males measure 20–45 mm (0.79–1.77 in) and adult females 40–63 mm (1.6–2.5 in) in snout–vent length; size varies considerably among populations. The dorsal colour is almost always green. Darker markings may be present but only very rarely form a triangle. There is a lateral series of large, dark brown blotches. Skin of the dorsum is rather coarsely granular, sometimes warty. Males have pectoral glands. The tadpoles are eel-shaped, heavily pigmented, and can grow to 64 mm (2.5 in) in length.

The male advertisement call is a single, deep "clack", sometimes preceded by a creaking sound.

== Habitat and conservation ==
Leptopelis gramineus typically inhabits montane grasslands, sometimes Afro-alpine moorland or even forest margins and montane forests. It can also occur in rural gardens and human settlements. It occurs at elevations between 1,900 and 3,900 m (6,200 and 12,800 ft) above sea level. It is a fossorial species. Reproduction takes place in pools and small streams, both permanent and temporary.

This species is common to abundant at suitable sites. Because of its adaptability, it is not considered being significantly threatened by environmental degradation caused by human settlement and small to large-scale agriculture. Chytrid fungus is common in the area, but its impact on this species is unknown. It occurs in the Bale Mountains National Park (although the park offers limited protection only).
