= Leptopelis mtoewaate =

Conservation status
- Endangered (IUCN 3.1)

Scientific classification
- Kingdom: Animalia
- Phylum: Chordata
- Class: Amphibia
- Order: Anura
- Family: Arthroleptidae
- Genus: Leptopelis
- Species: L. mtoewaate

Binomial name
- Leptopelis mtoewaate Portillo & Greenbaum, 2014

Species of treefrog

Leptopelis mtoewaate, the Kabembe treefrog, is a species of the genus Leptopelis and the family Arthroleptidae. The species is arboreal, living in mid-elevation wetland forests of the Itombwe Plateau, within the Albertine Rift in central Africa. This habitat is encompassed by the eastern edge of the Democratic Republic of Congo and areas within the 100 kilometres (62 mi) east of its border. Specimens were found at elevations of 777 to 1,965 m (2,549 to 6,447 ft), inhabiting trees close to inland waterbodies. Its tadpoles were collected from a stream and a lake floodplain. It was first described in 2014 by Portillo and Greenbaum.
