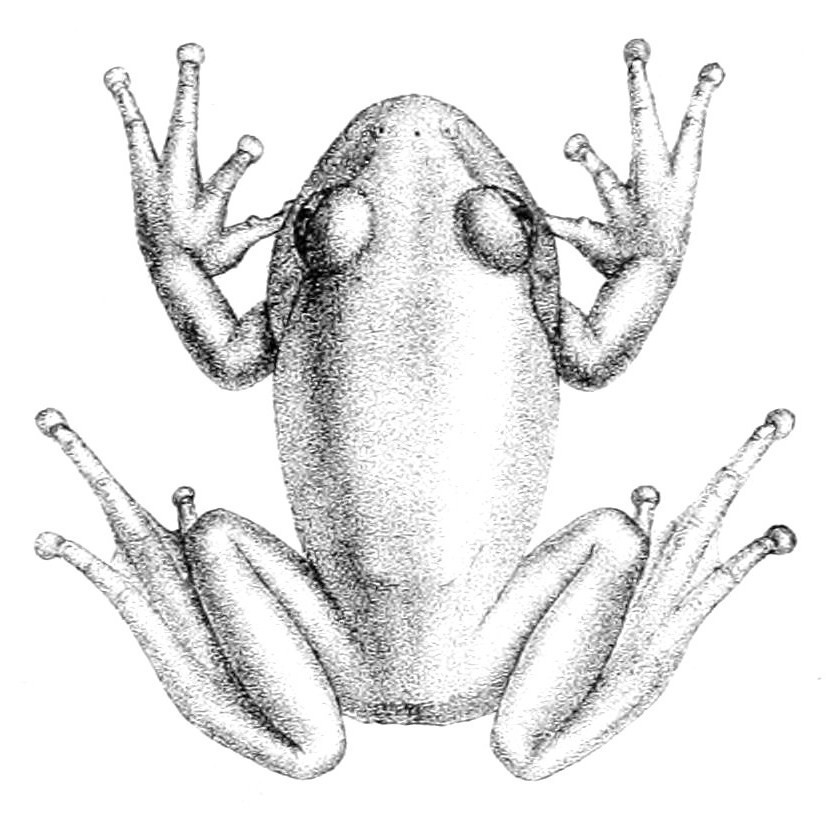

Conservation status
- Least Concern (IUCN 3.1)

Scientific classification
- Kingdom: Animalia
- Phylum: Chordata
- Class: Amphibia
- Order: Anura
- Family: Arthroleptidae
- Genus: Leptopelis
- Species: L. viridis

Binomial name
- Leptopelis viridis (Günther, 1869)

Synonyms
- Hylambates viridis Günther, 1869 "1868"; Hylambates hyloides Boulenger, 1906 "1905"; Leptopelis nanus Ahl, 1924; Leptopelis togoensis Ahl, 1929; Leptopelis liberiensis Ahl, 1929; Leptopelis hyloides Boulenger, 1906

= Leptopelis viridis =

Species of frog

Leptopelis viridis (the rusty forest treefrog or savannah tree frog) is a species of frog in the family Arthroleptidae. It is widely distributed in the West and Central African savanna zone between Senegal and the Gambia to the northeastern Democratic Republic of Congo (Garamba National Park).

== Distribution ==
According to the International Union for Conservation of Nature (IUCN), Leptopelis viridis is recorded in the following countries (listed from west to east): Senegal, the Gambia, Guinea-Bissau, Guinea, Sierra Leone, Liberia, Ivory Coast, Burkina Faso, Ghana, Togo, Benin, Niger, Nigeria, Cameroon, and the Democratic Republic of the Congo. Further, it is expected to occur Mali, Chad, the Central African Republic, Sudan, and South Sudan.

== Taxonomy ==
Leptopelis viridis was described in 1869 by Albert Günther, a German-born British zoologist, ichthyologist, and herpetologist. In 2007 it was shown that the holotype specimen of Leptopelis hyloides, described by George Albert Boulenger in 1906 as Hylambates hyloides, was a synonym of Leptopelis viridis. However, the species name Leptopelis hyloides (or Hylambates hyloides) had often been applied to a forest species (common name: Gbanga forest treefrog) distinct from L. viridis. This forest species was described as Leptopelis spiritusnoctis in 2007. All older records of Leptopelis hyloides, except the type, refer to Leptopelis spiritusnoctis.

== Description ==
Males measure 33–35 mm (1.3–1.4 in) (30–36 mm according to Rödel) and females 42–48 mm (1.7–1.9 in) in snout–vent length. The dorsum is smooth and brown with a darker pattern, normally consisting of an occipital bar and an 'n'-shaped dorsal marking. Also a green specimen without a dark lateral stripe has been photographed. This suggests that a green phase may be present in this species. Indeed, the specific name viridis suggests that the type specimen had been green in life. Males have dark, almost uniform black throats. There is no webbing on hands and the webbing in feet is reduced.

== Habitat and conservation ==
Leptopelis viridis lives in dry and humid savanna woodland, shrubland, and grassland; it tolerates habitat alteration. Breeding takes place in temporary savanna ponds; the eggs, however, are not deposited in water but in burrows on the ground, near the water.

Leptopelis viridis is a very common species that occurs in many protected areas. It is adaptable, and there are no significant threats to it.
