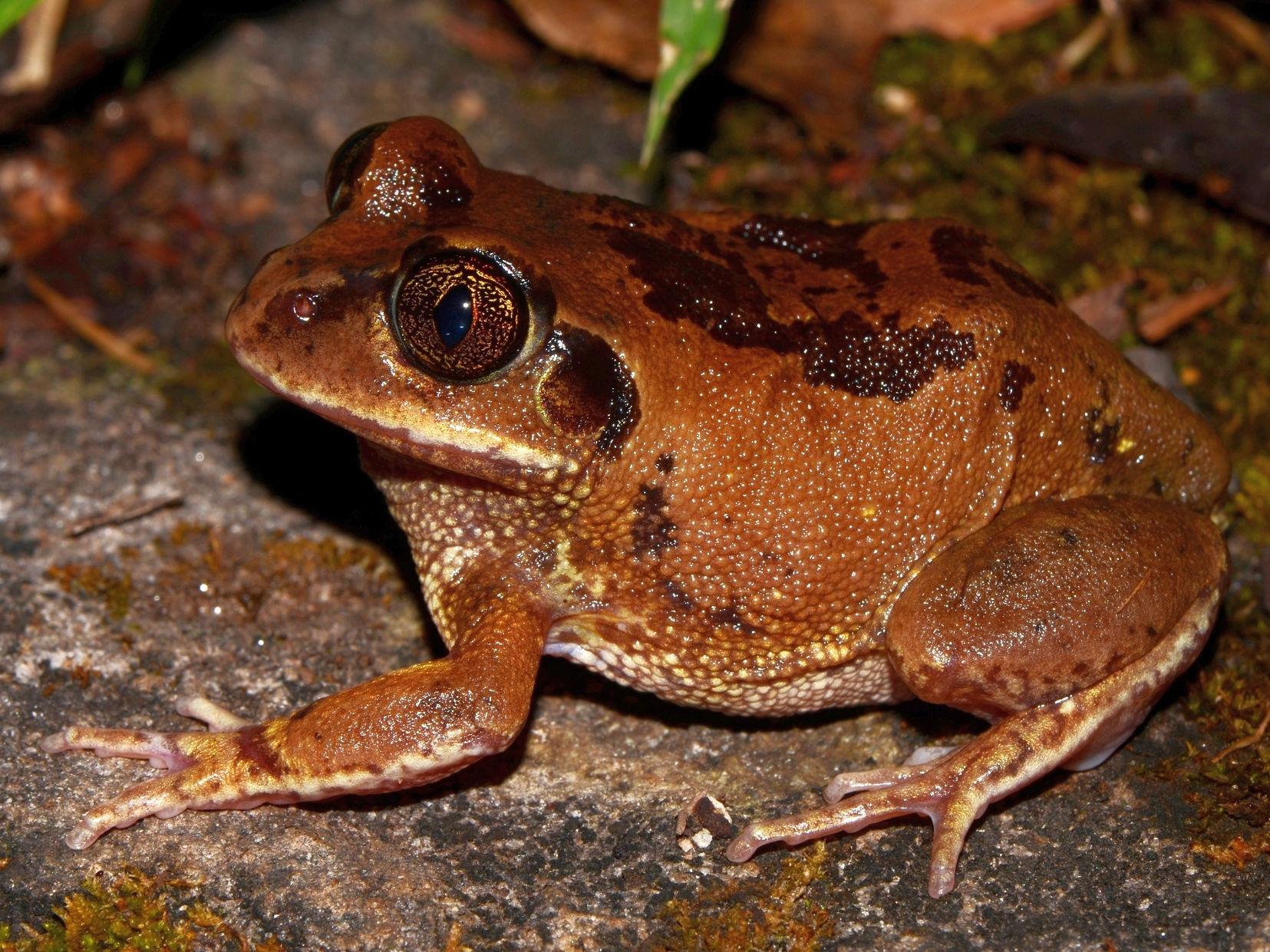

Conservation status
- Least Concern (IUCN 3.1)

Scientific classification
- Kingdom: Animalia
- Phylum: Chordata
- Class: Amphibia
- Order: Anura
- Family: Arthroleptidae
- Genus: Leptopelis
- Species: L. bocagii

Binomial name
- Leptopelis bocagii (Günther, 1865)

Synonyms
- Cystignathus bocagii Günther, 1865 "1864"; Hylambates angolensis Bocage, 1893; Hylambates brevipalmatus Ahl, 1930

= Bocage's tree frog =

Species of amphibian

Bocage's tree frog (Leptopelis bocagii) is a species of frog in the family Arthroleptidae. It is found in Angola, Burundi, Cameroon, Democratic Republic of the Congo, Ethiopia, Kenya, Namibia, Rwanda, Tanzania, Zambia, and Zimbabwe, and possibly Botswana, Central African Republic, Chad, Malawi, Mozambique, Nigeria, Sudan, and Uganda.

== Description ==
Bocage's tree frog is a large species that spends much of the year underground in a burrow; males grow to a length of 50 mm (2.0 in) and females 58 mm (2.3 in). Leptopelis bocagii exhibit significant dorsal color variation, ranging from bright green to brown, which is also a common trait among other Leptopelis species. The upper parts are brown, with a darker brown patch on the back which may extend onto the head, or a dark M- or N-shaped blotch on the back. The digits are largely unwebbed and have reduced or no discs. The juvenile has a green or greenish-brown back.

== Distribution and habitat ==
Bocage's tree frog is very similar in appearance to the Lake Upemba forest tree frog (Leptopelis parbocagii) and they are probably part of a species complex. Their ranges overlap, but Bocage's tree frog has a larger range, extending from Ethiopia southwards to Namibia and Zambia. Its typical habitat is grassland and savannah, both wet and dry.

== Ecology ==
Bocage's tree frog is a ground-dwelling and largely burrowing species and thus easily overlooked outside the breeding season. The call of the male, usually uttered from the ground or occasionally from low vegetation, is an atonal "waaab", sometimes repeated immediately. It breeds in temporary pools in the rainy season, the eggs being laid in a hole in the ground near the water's edge.

== Status ==
Bocage's tree frog is a common species with a wide range and a presumed large total population, is able to adapt to habitats disturbed by man and faces no particular threats. For these reasons, the International Union for Conservation of Nature has assessed its conservation status as being of "least concern".
