= Common forest tree frog =

Conservation status
- Least Concern (IUCN 3.1)

Scientific classification
- Kingdom: Animalia
- Phylum: Chordata
- Class: Amphibia
- Order: Anura
- Family: Arthroleptidae
- Genus: Leptopelis
- Species: L. notatus

Binomial name
- Leptopelis notatus (Peters, 1875)

Species of amphibian

The common forest tree frog (Leptopelis notatus) is a species of frog in the family Arthroleptidae found in Angola, Cameroon, the Republic of the Congo, the Democratic Republic of the Congo, Equatorial Guinea, Gabon, Nigeria, and possibly the Central African Republic. Its natural habitats are subtropical or tropical moist lowland forest, subtropical or tropical moist montane forest, subtropical or tropical high-altitude grassland, rivers, intermittent freshwater marshes, and heavily degraded former forests.
