= Gughe =

Mountain in Ethiopia

- Location within Ethiopia

Highest point
- Elevation: 4,200 m (13,800 ft)
- Coordinates: 06°12′N 37°30′E

Geography
- Location: Ethiopia

Gughe or Guge is a mountain located near the city of Arba Minch, and the Abaya Lake, in Ethiopia.
