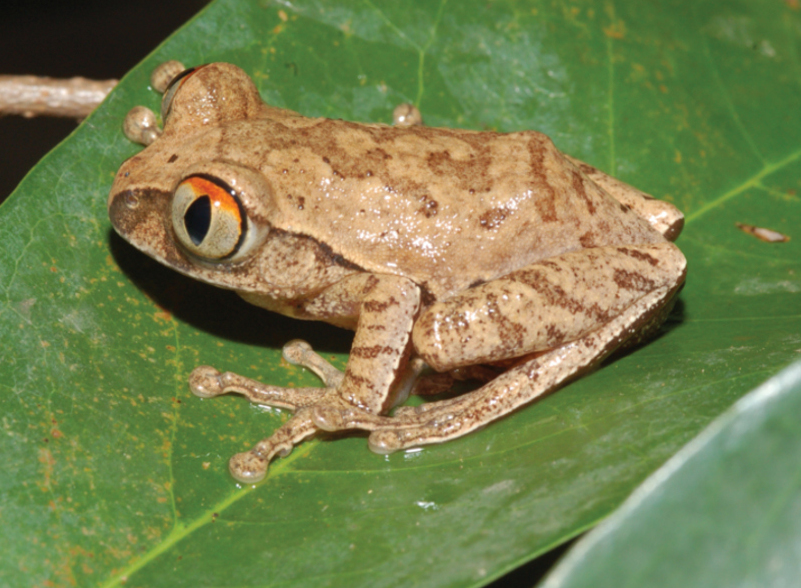

Conservation status
- Least Concern (IUCN 3.1)

Scientific classification
- Kingdom: Animalia
- Phylum: Chordata
- Class: Amphibia
- Order: Anura
- Family: Arthroleptidae
- Genus: Leptopelis
- Species: L. spiritusnoctis

Binomial name
- Leptopelis spiritusnoctis Rödel, 2007

= Leptopelis spiritusnoctis =

Species of frog

Leptopelis spiritusnoctis is a species of frog in the family Arthroleptidae. It is found in West Africa from Guinea to the Niger Delta in Nigeria, the intervening countries being Sierra Leone, Liberia, Ivory Coast, Ghana, Togo, and Benin. This species was previously known as Leptopelis hyloides, but that name is actually a junior synonym of Leptopelis viridis.

== Etymology ==
The specific name spiritusnoctis means "spirit of the night" and is derived from the Latin words noctu meaning "at night", and spiritus meaning "spirit" or "soul". It describes the nocturnal habit of this species and its whispering buzzing sounds, audible all over the forests during rainy nights.

== Description ==
Males measure 25–33 mm (0.98–1.30 in) and females 43–52 mm (1.7–2.0 in) in snout–vent length. The colouration is variable< the dorsum is light brown to dark chocolate brown<; the anterior loreal region, canthus rostralis, and supratympanal fold are darker in colour. There is a dark, interorbital triangle that points backward and typically connects to a reversed Y- or U-like pattern in the scapular region; there may also be irregular shaped, scattered dark spots and points. An irregularly shaped lumbar blotch is almost always present. The iris is silver-grey, or yellow to red in its uppermost forth to third. The tadpoles are eel-shaped and darkly pigmented. They measure 34 mm (1.3 in) in total length, or larger.

== Habitat and conservation ==
The species' natural habitats are primary and secondary evergreen forests, semi-deciduous forests, and forest galleries in savanna. It also occurs in heavily degraded former forest. It is often found in moist areas and near streams. Breeding takes place in very small puddles and temporary ponds. The tadpoles move to water after hatching from the burrows near the water where the eggs had been deposited.

Leptopelis spiritusnoctis is an extremely common species that is not facing significant threats.
