= Leptopelis mackayi =

Conservation status
- Vulnerable (IUCN 3.1)

Scientific classification
- Kingdom: Animalia
- Phylum: Chordata
- Class: Amphibia
- Order: Anura
- Family: Arthroleptidae
- Genus: Leptopelis
- Species: L. mackayi

Binomial name
- Leptopelis mackayi Köhler, Bwong, Schick, Veith, and Lötters, 2006

Species of frog

Leptopelis mackayi, the Mackay's forest treefrog or Mackay's tree frog, is a species of arboreal frog from the family Arthroleptidae. Described in 2006, it is currently known from the Kakamega Forest of western Kenya (its type locality) and from eastern Democratic Republic of Congo; its full range is likely wider, including suitable habitat in the intervening Uganda.

== Etymology ==
The specific name mackayi honours Alex Duff-MacKay (1939–2003), herpetologist active in Kenya.

== Description ==
Males grow to 36 mm (1.4 in) and females to 40 mm (1.6 in) in snout–vent length. The head is slightly wider than the body. The snout is rounded. The tympanum is distinct and round or slightly oval. The fingers and the toes have partial webbing, lateral fringes, and round terminal disks. The dorsum is pale brown with a dark, irregular pattern and fine white spots. There is a white spot under the eye. Males have a white vocal sac.

A Gosner stage 27 tadpole measures 27 mm (1.1 in) in length, of which the tail makes two thirds.

== Habitat and conservation ==
Leptopelis mackayi is an arboreal species forest species found at elevations of 1,220 to 1,700 m (4,000 to 5,580 ft). Specimens have been located in both secondary forests and disturbed environments. One tadpole was identified within a puddle. Egg deposition is probably terrestrial, with the tadpoles wriggling themselves into puddles.

This species is considered "vulnerable" because it is only known from two localities and because its habitat is believed to be declining in quality and quantity. It is present in the Kakamega Forest National Park.
