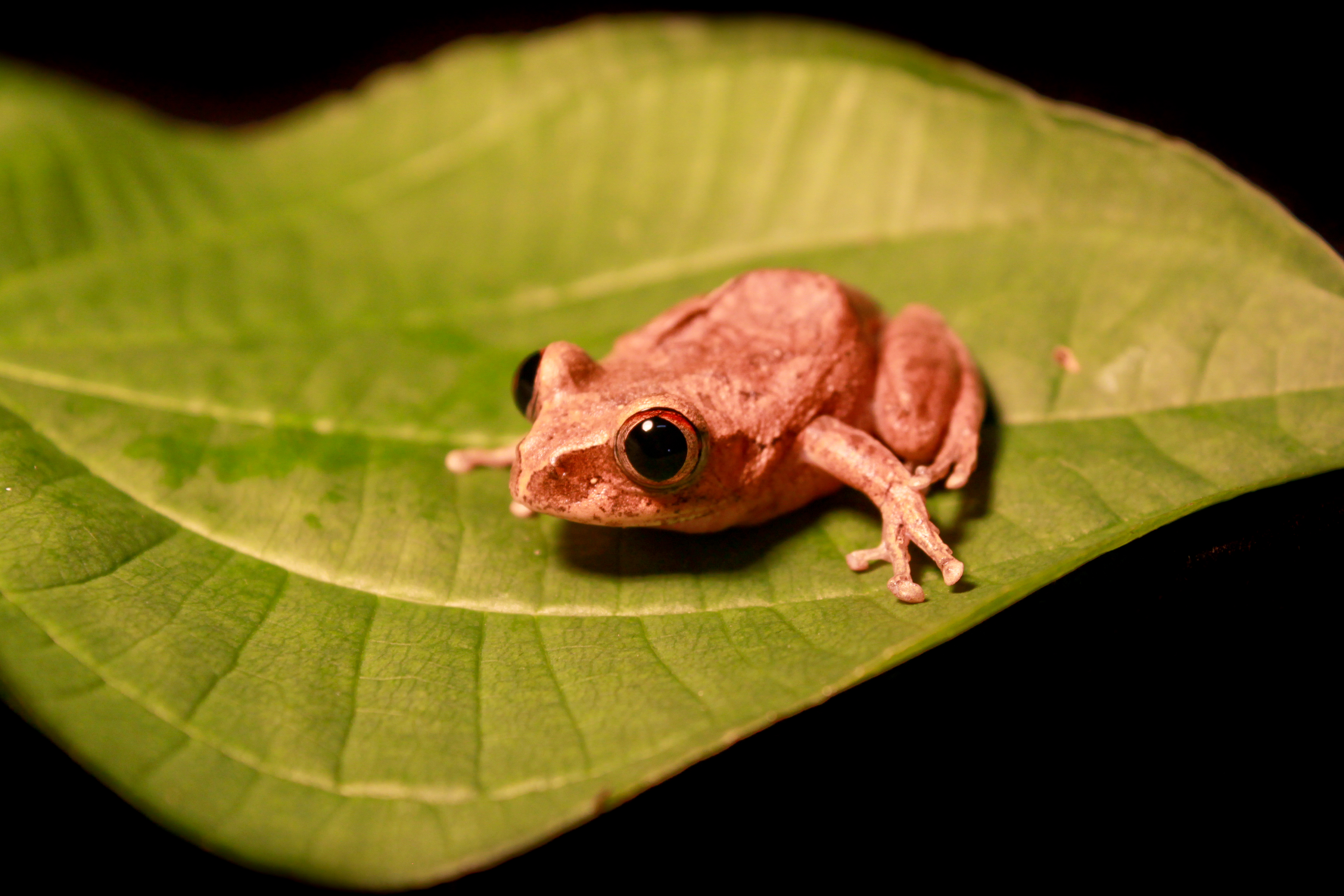

Conservation status
- Least Concern (IUCN 3.1)

Scientific classification
- Kingdom: Animalia
- Phylum: Chordata
- Class: Amphibia
- Order: Anura
- Family: Arthroleptidae
- Genus: Leptopelis
- Species: L. aubryi

Binomial name
- Leptopelis aubryi (A.H.A. Duméril, 1856)

Synonyms
- Hyla punctata Hallowell, 1855 "1854"; Hyla aubryi Duméril, 1856; Hylambates Haugi Mocquard, 1902; Nyctibates laevis Barbour, 1911; Leptopelis buchholzi Ahl, 1929

= Leptopelis aubryi =

Species of amphibian

Leptopelis aubryi, also known as the Aubry's tree frog and Gaboon forest treefrog, is a species of frog in the family Arthroleptidae. It is found in southeastern Nigeria, Cameroon, Central African Republic, Equatorial Guinea, Gabon, Republic of the Congo, western and northern Democratic Republic of the Congo, and Angola (Cabinda Enclave and extreme northeastern contiguous Angola).

== Etymology ==
The specific name aubryi refers to Charles Eugène Aubry-Lecomte, a French colonial administrator and an amateur naturalist.

== Taxonomy ==
Leptopelis aubryi is similar to Leptopelis spiritusnoctis (referred to as Leptopelis hyloides prior to 2007) from West Africa, and they have sometimes been treated as conspecific. However, acoustic (male calls) and genetic data support their treatment as separate species. In fact, the large variation of call characteristics in L. aubryi could indicate that the current delimitation of this species might hide a complex of cryptic species.

== Description ==
Adult males measure 33–39 mm (1.3–1.5 in) and females 44–54 mm (1.7–2.1 in) in snout–vent length. The dorsum is brown and has an occipital triangle and rounded lateral spots. There are small, dark points present on the flanks, especially in the groin, and often small, white spots on the back and limbs.

== Habitat and conservation ==
Leptopelis aubryi is an arboreal species living in a range of habitats: secondary forests, swamp forests, and also degraded habitats (farm bush) outside forests. The eggs are laid in a nest, buried in mud near swamps and pools where the tadpoles later develop.

Leptopelis aubryi is an adaptable and reasonably common species. It occurs in a number of protected areas, including the Korup National Park (Cameroon) and Monte Alén National Park (Equatorial Guinea). No significant threats have been identified.
