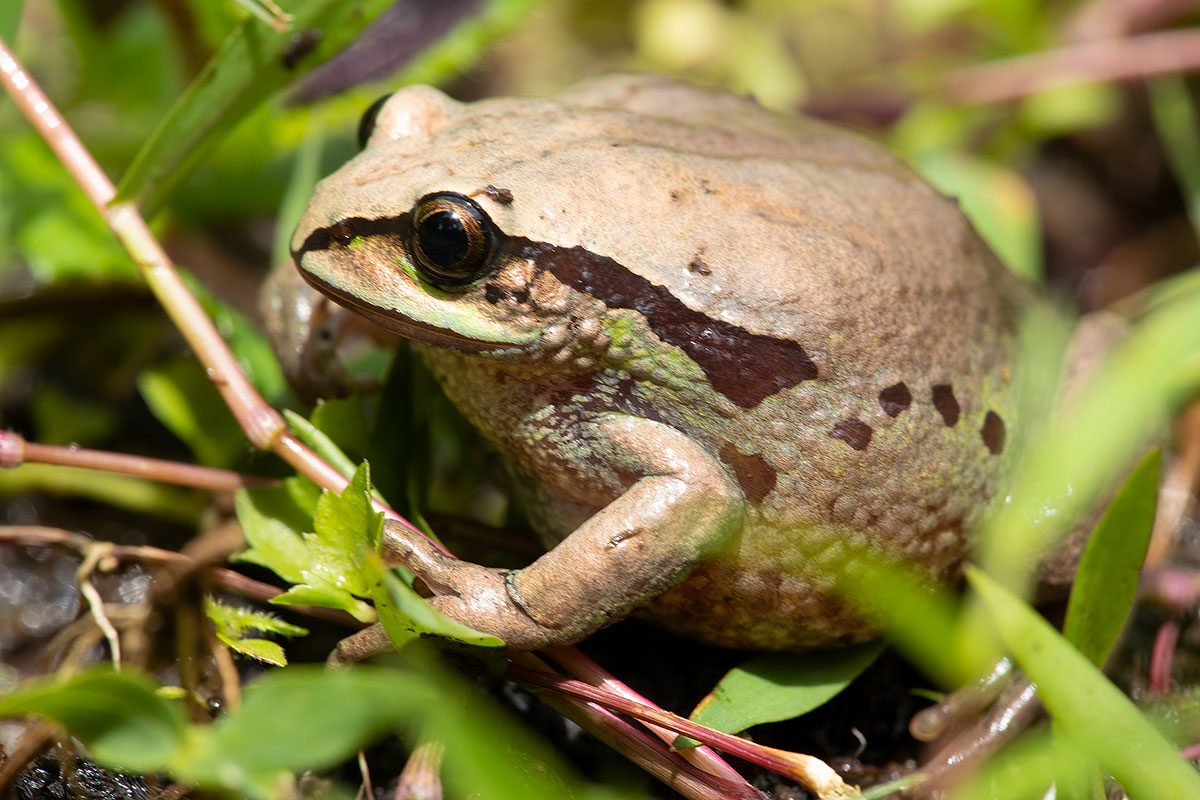

Scientific classification
- Kingdom: Animalia
- Phylum: Chordata
- Class: Amphibia
- Order: Anura
- Family: Arthroleptidae
- Genus: Leptopelis
- Species: L. diffidens

Binomial name
- Leptopelis diffidens Tiutenko & Zinenko, 2021

= Leptopelis diffidens =

Species of frog

Leptopelis diffidens is a species of frog from the genus Leptopelis. It's native to highlands in Ethiopia. It's found in elevations of 1,400 and 2,300 m (4,600 and 7,500 ft). It was described by Tiutenko and Zinenko in 2021.
