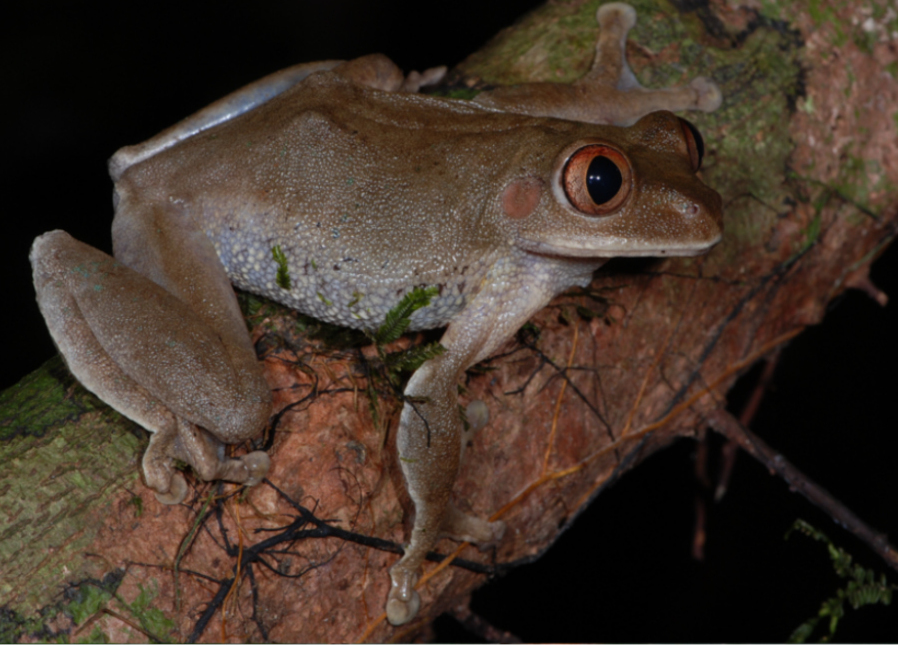

Conservation status
- Near Threatened (IUCN 3.1)

Scientific classification
- Kingdom: Animalia
- Phylum: Chordata
- Class: Amphibia
- Order: Anura
- Family: Arthroleptidae
- Genus: Leptopelis
- Species: L. macrotis

Binomial name
- Leptopelis macrotis Schiøtz, 1967

= Leptopelis macrotis =

Species of frog

Leptopelis macrotis, sometimes called the big-eyed forest tree frog, is a species of frog in the family Arthroleptidae. It is found in the rainforests of Sierra Leone, southern Guinea, Liberia, Ivory Coast, and southern Ghana. Notice that similar common name "big-eyed tree frog" is sometimes used for Leptopelis vermiculatus from Tanzania and for Litoria exophthalmia from New Guinea.

== Description ==
Leptopelis macrotis is a large Leptopelis species: females measure 74–84 mm (2.9–3.3 in) in snout–vent length, while males are more modest at 40–46 mm (1.6–1.8 in) SVL. The dorsum is smooth and transversely-striped in shades of brown. The tympanum is large. The feet are fully webbed.

== Habitat and conservation ==
Its natural habitats are primary rainforests at elevations of 100–700 m (330–2,300 ft) above sea level. It lives arboreally along streams; males can often be heard calling from branches near streams some 5–10 m above the ground.

Leptopelis macrotis is a relatively common species. However, because it relies on good (i.e., non-degraded) rainforest, habitat degradation caused by agricultural expansion, logging, and human settlements is a major threat. Mining and river pollution are also potential threats. It occurs in a number of protected areas, including the Gola Forest Reserve (its type locality), Taï National Park, Kambui Hills Forest Reserve, and Bobiri Forest Reserve. The International Union for Conservation of Nature (IUCN) has assessed it as being "Vulnerable"—despite its large range, the actual area of occupancy is modest (about 236 km^{2}), and its habitat is being lost.
