= Monte Alén National Park =

National park in Equatorial Guinea

- IUCN category II (national park)
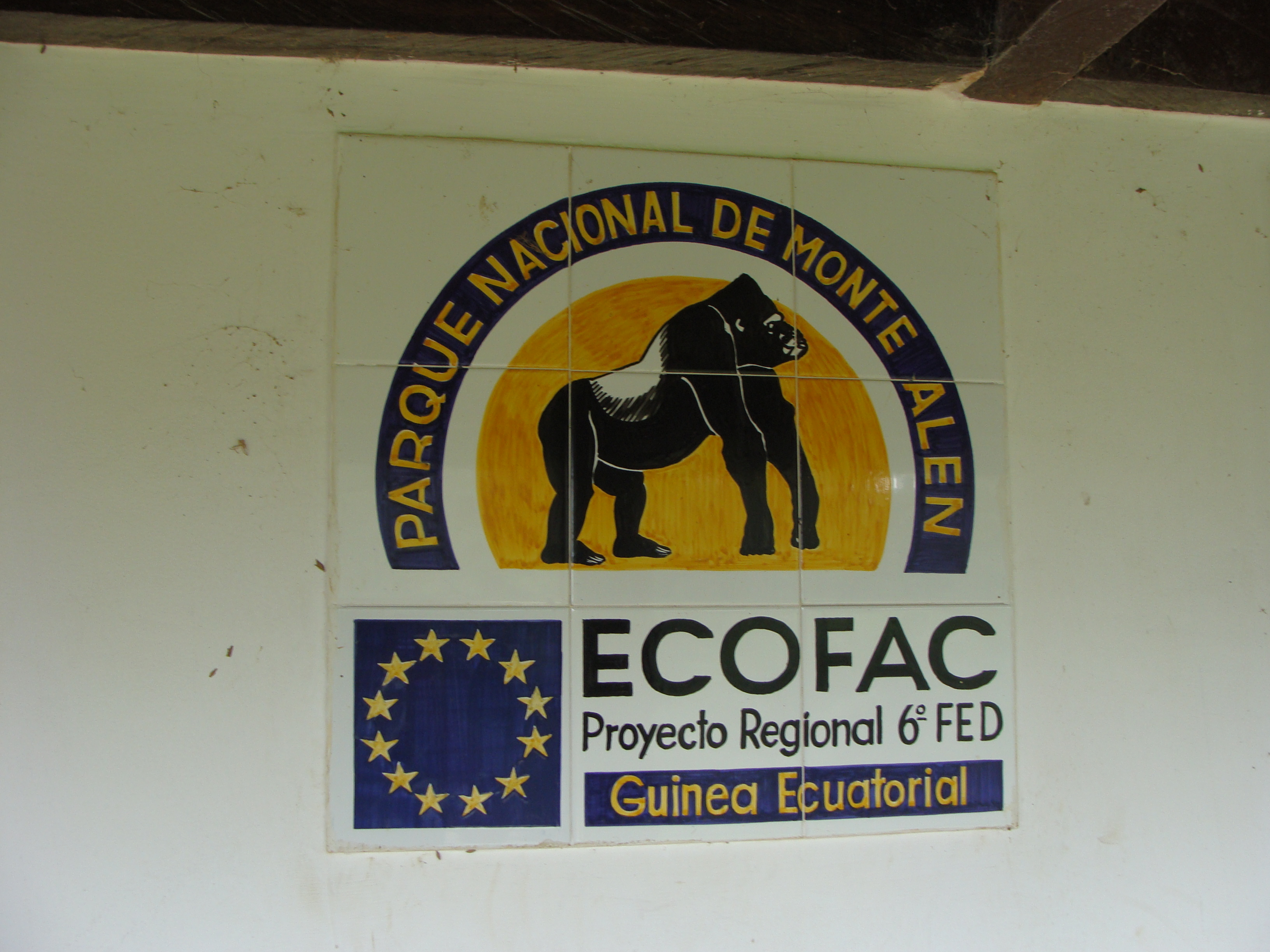
- Entrance sign (2010)

- Location within Equatorial Guinea
- Location: Equatorial Guinea
- Coordinates: 1°31′48″N 10°6′36″E
- Area: 2,000 km^{2} (770 sq mi)
- Established: 1990

Monte Alén National Park (Spanish: Parque nacional de Monte Alén) is located near the center of Equatorial Guinea. It was established in 1990. With an area of 2,000 km^{2} (770 sq mi), it is the country's largest national park. The goliath frog, one of the prominent amphibians found in the park, is the biggest frog in the world; hunting it is prohibited.

== Geography and environment ==
The park has an area of 2,000 km^{2} (770 sq mi) and lies within the elevation range of 300–1,250 m (980–4,100 ft). It was declared a national park under a presidential decree in 2000 in addition to 13 other areas.

The highest peaks of Monte Alén and Monte Mitra lie within the limits of the park. Uoro River lies to the west of the park. The eastern part of the park is bounded by the Niefang-Gabon road. There are a few patches of rock outcrops. Lake Atoc (Lago Atoc) has forest cover throughout its entire catchment.

Trekking paths are well laid out in the park. Logging operation within the park is fully controlled.

=== Climate ===
The climate is hot humid equatorial, with an average temperature of about 25 °C (77 °F) in the lowland area and 20–23 °C (68–73 °F) in the highlands. The mean annual rainfall is between 3,000–3,500 mm (120–140 in).

=== Wildlife ===
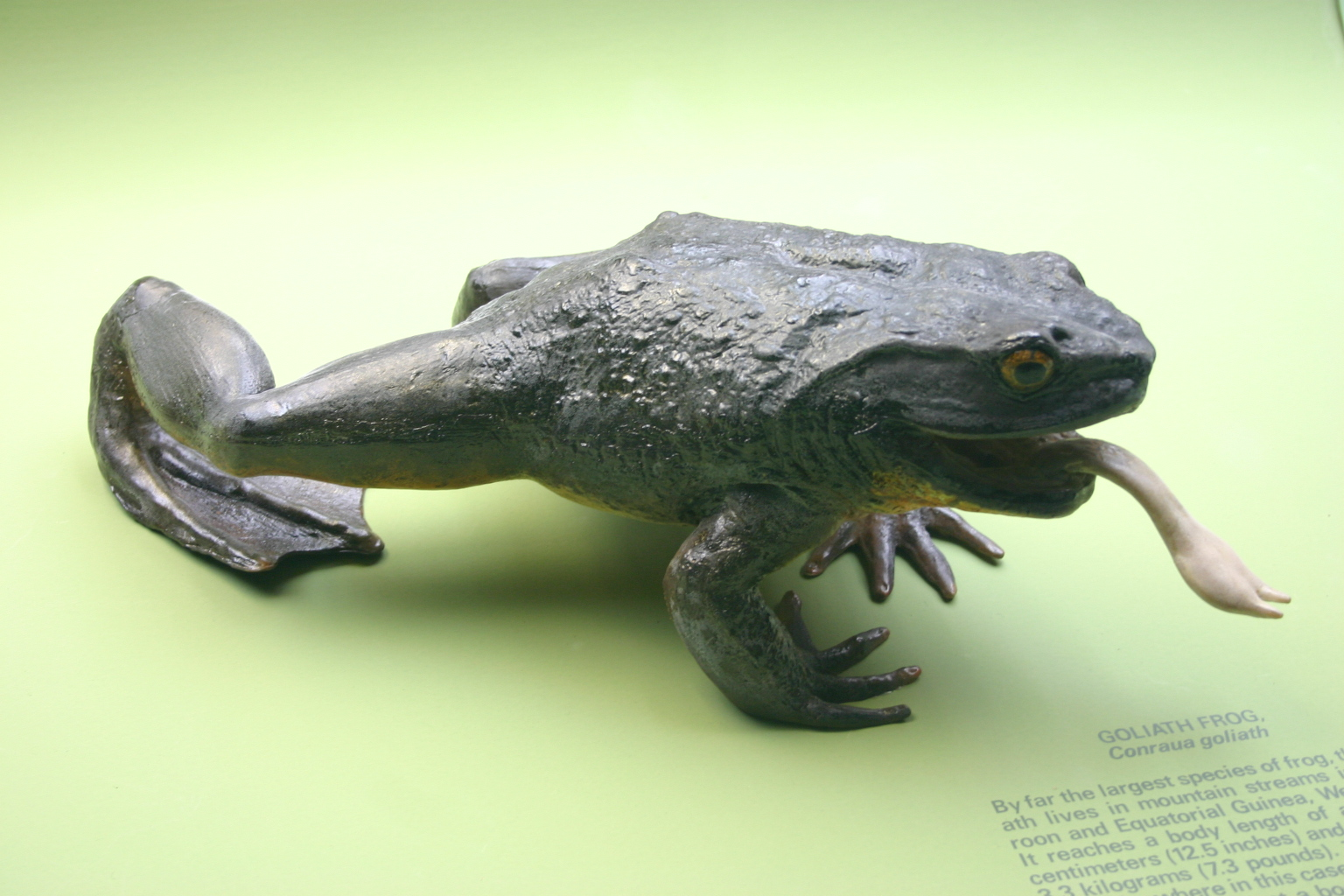
A model of the goliath frog (Conraua goliath) in the American Museum of Natural History

The park has recorded 265 species of birds and has been designated an Important Bird Area (IBA) by BirdLife International because it supports significant populations of many bird species. Some of the prominent species include three montane species: grey cuckooshrike, pink-footed puffback and black-capped woodland warbler; Uganda woodland warbler, grey-necked rockfowl, Zenker's honeyguide, Tessmann's flycatcher and Gabon batis.

The park has 105 mammal species which includes 16 species of primates. These include black colobus, collared mangabey, mandrills, gorillas and chimpanzees. Other mammal species include bush elephants, forest elephants and Grasse's shrews.

Sixty-five species of reptiles are reported, including crocodiles. Amphibians include Petropedetes palmipes and Leptodactylodon stevarti, which are in the IUCN Red List. Goliath frogs are found in the southern part of the park.

=== Conservation ===
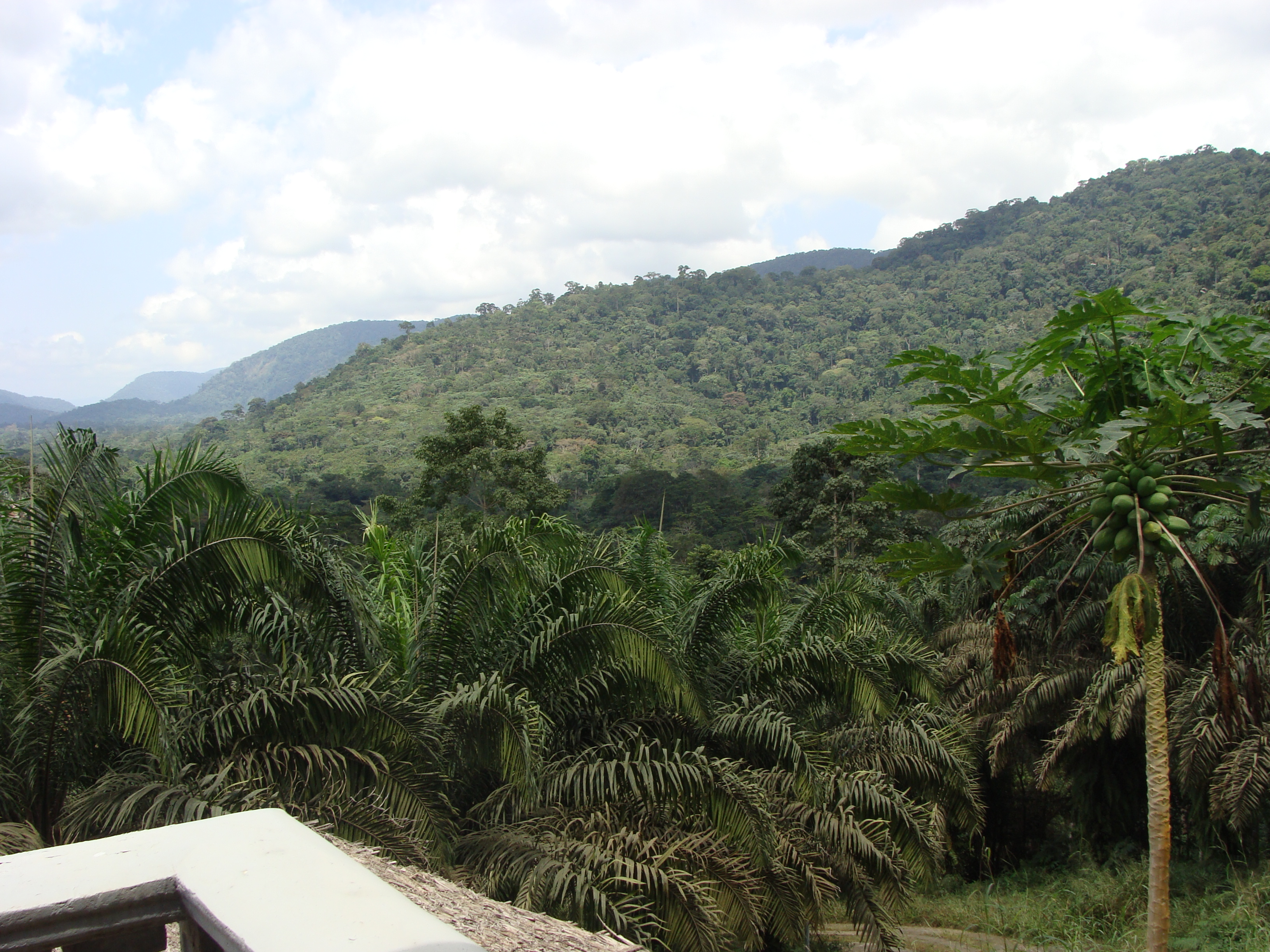
Monte Alén

In 1989, conservation of the forest area of the park was zoned for purpose of awarding concessions for logging, and agroforestry activities were encouraged. A study conducted under USAID observed that hunting of mammals in the park was a serious issue which needed urgent remedial conservation action. By 2005, Caldecott reported that agriculture, hunting, and logging were not allowed in the park.

== Bibliography ==
- Caldecott, Julian Oliver; Miles, Lera (2005). World Atlas of Great Apes and Their Conservation. University of California Press. p. 345. ISBN 978-0-520-24633-1.
- Davies, Glyn; Brown, David, eds. (13 November 2007). Bushmeat and livelihoods: wildlife management and poverty reduction. Blackwell Pub. ISBN 978-1-4051-6779-6.
- Dorcas, Michael E.; Gibbons, Whit (6 April 2011). Frogs: The Animal Answer Guide. JHU Press. ISBN 978-0-8018-9935-5.
- Planet, Lonely (1 October 2014). The World: A Traveller's Guide to the Planet. Lonely Planet Publications. ISBN 978-1-74360-584-4.
- Resources, International Union for Conservation of Nature and Natural (1989). IUCN Bulletin. International Union for Conservation of Nature and Natural Resources.
- Richmond, Simon; Butler, Stuart; Clammer, Paul; Corne, Lucy; Fitzpatrick, Mary; Holden, Trent; Lee, Jessica; Smith, Helena; Wheeler, Donna (1 October 2013). Lonely Planet Africa. Lonely Planet Publications. ISBN 978-1-74321-803-7.
- Sirohi, Madhu Singh (1 January 2008). Endangered: Life in the Amphibian World. The Energy and Resources Institute (TERI). ISBN 978-81-7993-195-0.
