= David Bruce (microbiologist) =

Scottish pathologist (1855–1931)

Major-General Sir David Bruce KCB FRS FRCP FRSE
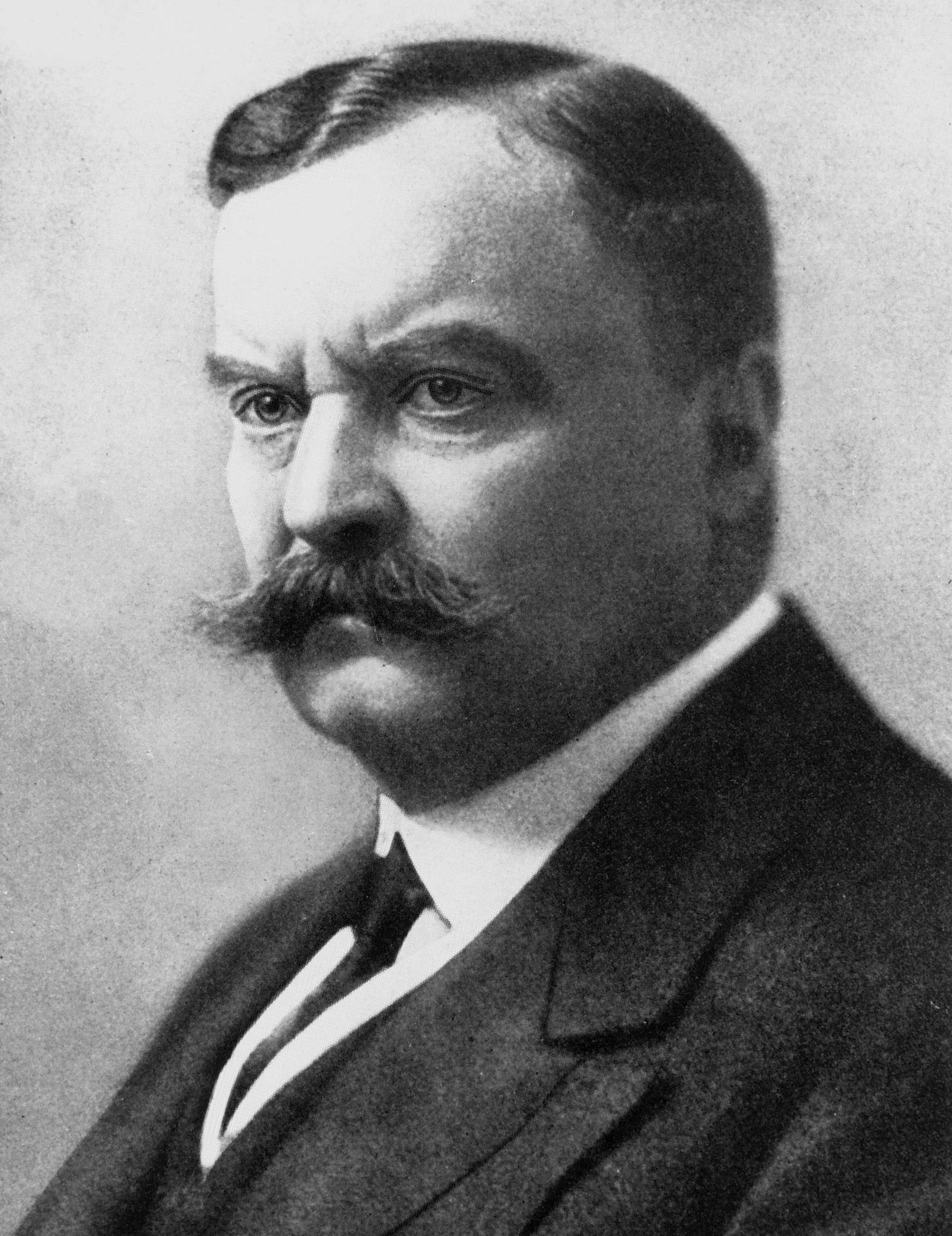
- Born: 29 May 1855; Melbourne, Australia
- Died: 27 November 1931 (aged 76); London, England
- Citizenship: British
- Education: University of Edinburgh
- Known for: Discovery of Brucella and Trypanosoma brucei
- Awards: Cameron Prize for Therapeutics of the University of Edinburgh (1899); Royal Medal (1904); Leeuwenhoek Medal (1915); Buchanan Medal (1922); Albert Medal (1923); Manson Medal (1923)
- Scientific career
- Fields: Microbiology

Major-General Sir David Bruce, KCB, FRS, FRCP, FRSE (29 May 1855 – 27 November 1931) was a Scottish pathologist and microbiologist who made some of the key contributions in tropical medicine. In 1887, he discovered a bacterium, now called Brucella, that caused what was known as Malta fever. In 1894, he discovered a protozoan parasite, named Trypanosoma brucei, as the causative pathogen of nagana (animal trypanosomiasis).

Working in the Army Medical Services and the Royal Army Medical Corps, Bruce's major scientific collaborator was his microbiologist wife Mary Elizabeth Bruce (née Steele), with whom he published around thirty technical papers out of his 172 papers. In 1886, he was chairman of the Malta Fever Commission that investigated the deadly disease, by which he identified a specific bacterium as the cause. Later, with his wife, he investigated an outbreak of animal disease called nagana in Zululand and discovered the protozoan parasite responsible for it. He led the second and third Sleeping Sickness Commission organised by the Royal Society that investigated an epidemic of human sleeping sickness in Uganda, where he established that tsetse fly was the carrier (vector) of these human and animal diseases.

The bacterium, Brucella, and the disease it caused, brucellosis, along with the protozoan Trypanosoma brucei, are named in his honour.

== Early life and education ==
Bruce was born in Melbourne, Colony of Victoria, to Scottish parents, engineer David Bruce (from Airth) and his wife Jane Russell Hamilton (from Stirling), who had emigrated to Australia in the gold rush of 1850. He returned with his family to Scotland at the age of five. They lived at 1 Victoria Square in Stirling. He was educated at Stirling High School and in 1869 began an apprenticeship in Manchester. However, a bout of pneumonia forced him to abandon this and re-assess his career. He then decided to study zoology but later changed to medicine at the University of Edinburgh in 1876. He graduated in 1881.

== Medical career ==
After a brief period as a general practitioner in Reigate, Surrey (1881–83), where he met and married his wife Mary, he entered the Army Medical School in Hampshire at the Royal Victoria Hospital, Netley. He passed the military examination in 1883 and joined the Army Medical Services (in which he served until 1919). For his first post he joined the Royal Army Medical Corps in 1884 and was stationed in Valletta, Malta.

Bruce was appointed assistant professor of pathology at the Army Medical School in Netley in 1889, and served there for five years. He returned to military field service in 1894 and was posted to Pietermaritzburg, Natal, South Africa. He was assigned to investigate the case of cattle and horse sickness (called nagana) in Zululand. On 27 October 1894, he and his wife (Mary Elizabeth) moved to Ubombo Hill, where the disease was most prevalent. When the Second Boer War broke out in 1899, accompanied by his wife, he ran the field hospital during the Siege of Ladysmith (2 November 1899 until 28 February 1900). For his service during the war, he was promoted to Lieutenant-Colonel. In 1899, Bruce was awarded the Cameron Prize for Therapeutics of the University of Edinburgh. In 1900, he joined the army commission investigating dysentery in military camps, at the same time working for the Royal Society's Sleeping Sickness Commission.

Bruce served as a member of the Army Medical Service Advisory Board from 1902 to 1911. In 1914 he became Commander of the Royal Army Medical College at Millbank, London, the position he held until his retirement as a Major-General in 1919. He was immediately appointed chairman of the governing body of the Lister Institute. During his career, he published more than ninety-seven technical articles, of which about thirty were co-authored by his wife.

== Death ==
He died four days after his wife in 1931, during her memorial service. Both were cremated in London and their ashes are buried together in Valley Cemetery in Stirling, close to Stirling Castle, beneath a simple stone cross on the east side of the main north-south path, near the southern roundel. They had no children.

== Scientific contributions ==
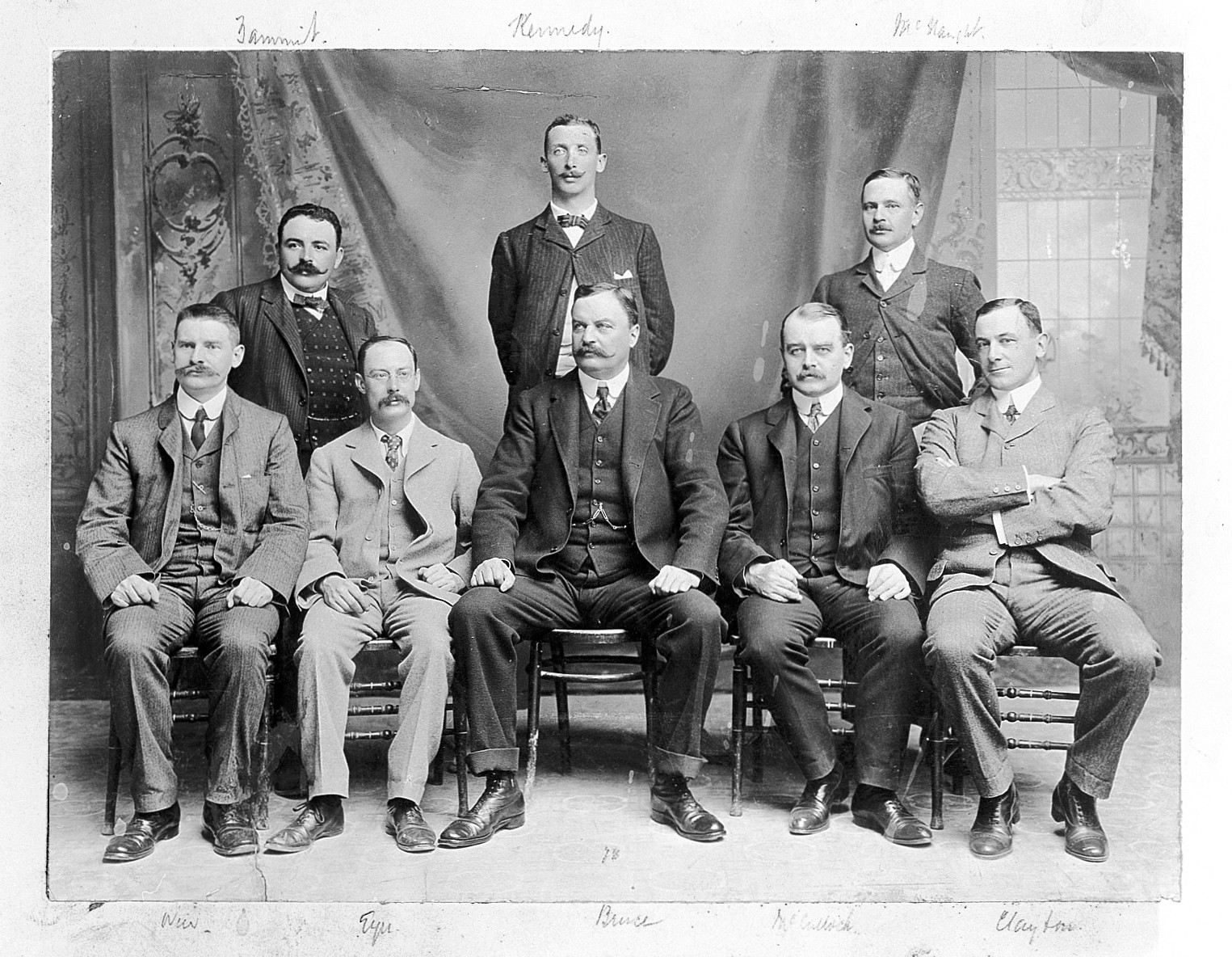
David Bruce (centre), with members of the Mediterranean Fever Commission (for brucellosis). Themistocles Zammit is on the left, standing.

=== Malta fever ===
At the time of Bruce's service in Malta, British soldiers suffered an outbreak of what was called the Malta fever. The disease caused undulant fever in men and abortion in goats. It is transmitted by goat milk. In 1886, Bruce led the Malta Fever Commission that investigated the epidemic. Between 1886 and 1887, he studied five patients having Malta fever who died of the disease. From the spleen of corpses, he recovered a bacterium which he referred to as Micrococcus, which he described:

When a minute portion taken from one of these [culture] colonies is placed in a drop of sterilized water and examined under a high power [of microscope], innumerable small micrococci are seen. They are very active and dance about—as a rule singly, sometimes in pairs, rarely in short chains.

Bruce's assistant, Surgeon Captain Matthew Louis Hughes named the disease "undulant fever" and the bacterium, Micrococcus melitensis. The source of the infection was not clear, Hughes believing it to come from the soil and the bacterium inhaled from the air. Bruce reported the discovery in The Practitioner in 1887 with the conclusion:

I think it will appear to be sufficiently proved: (a) that there exists in the spleen of cases of Malta fever a definite micro-organism; and (b) that this micro-organism can be cultivated outside the human body. On the latter point, I may remark that I have already cultivated four successive generations. It now remains to be seen what effect, if any, this micro-organism has on healthy animals; what are the conditions of temperature, &c., under which it flourishes; where it is to be found; how it gains entrance to its human host; and many other points. All of these will take a long time to investigate. I have therefore published this preliminary note in order to draw the attention of other workers to what seems to me to be an attractive field.

He was later proven correct when, in 1905, goat milk was established as the source of infection. The discovery that the disease was transmitted from goat milk was generally attributed to Bruce himself. But an analysis of the historical record in 2005 revealed that Themistocles Zammit, one of the members of the commission, was the one who experimentally demonstrated the origin of the bacterium from goat milk.

The genus Micrococcus was changed to Brucella in honour of Bruce and is accepted as a valid name. Accordingly, the disease has been renamed brucellosis.

=== Fly disease and sleeping sickness ===
When Bruce was transferred to South Africa, he was sent to Zululand to investigate the outbreak of animal disease which the natives called nagana, and the Europeans, the fly disease. In 1894, he and his wife found that the disease was prevalent among cattle, donkeys, horses, and dogs. They collected blood samples from such infected animals and found parasites which Bruce identified correctly as a type of "Haematozoon" (attributed to protozoans that are blood parasites), as he described in his report in 1895:

At this point, I think it will be convenient to give a definite description of the parasite discovered by me in the blood of animals affected by this disease and to bring forward my reasons for considering it to be the proximate exciting cause of the disease. For the present I shall call it the Haematozoon or Blood Parasite of Fly disease, although in all probability on further knowledge, it will be found to be identical with the haematozoon of Surra, which is called Trypanosoma Evansi or at least a species belonging to that genus...

He also made accurate identification characters of the parasite as unique organisms:

[Under a microscope] can be seen transparent elongated bodies in active movement, wriggling about like tiny snakes and swimming from corpuscle to corpuscle, which they seem to seize upon and worry. They appear to be about a quarter of the diameter of a Red Blood Corpuscle in thickness, and 2 or 3 times the diameter of a corpuscle in length. They are pointed or somewhat blunt at one end, and the other extremity is seen to be prolonged into a very fine lash, which is in constant whip-like motion. Running along the cylindrical body between the two extremities can be seen a transparent delicate longitudinal membrane or fin [later named undulating membrane] which is also constantly in wave-like motion... These parasites evidently belong to a very low form of animal life, namely the infusoria, and simply consist of a small mass of protoplasm surrounded by a limiting membrane, and without any differentiation of structure, except in so far as the membrane is prolonged to form the longitudinal fin and flagellum.

He performed several experiments on different animals as to how the parasite was transmitted. He found that the tsetse fly (Glossina morsitans), which was common in the region, could carry the live parasites from feeding on the blood of the animals. He established that "the Tsetse Fly plays a most important part in the propagation of the disease", but was unable to show that the flies could actually transmit the disease. He explained:

I have not been able exactly to prove the part which the Tsetse Fly plays in the causation or production of the Fly Disease, I think it well to begin with a consideration of the Fly itself, not only on account of its historical value, but also because I am at present of opinion that the Tsetse Fly does play some part, and perhaps no inconsiderable part, in the propagation of the disease. Be it at once stated that I have not the slightest belief in the notion popularly prevalent up to the present that the Fly causes the disease by the injection of a poison elaborated by itself, after the manner of the leech, which injects a fluid to prevent the coagulation of the blood, or the snake for the purpose of procuring its prey or for defence, but that at most the Tsetse acts as a carrier of a living virus, an infinitely small parasite, from one animal to another, which entering into the bloodstream of the animal bitten or pricked, there propagates and so gives rise to the disease.

Henry George Plimmer and John Rose Bradford gave the full description of the new parasite in 1899 as Trypanosoma brucei, the name after the discoverer.

==== Sleeping Sickness Commission ====
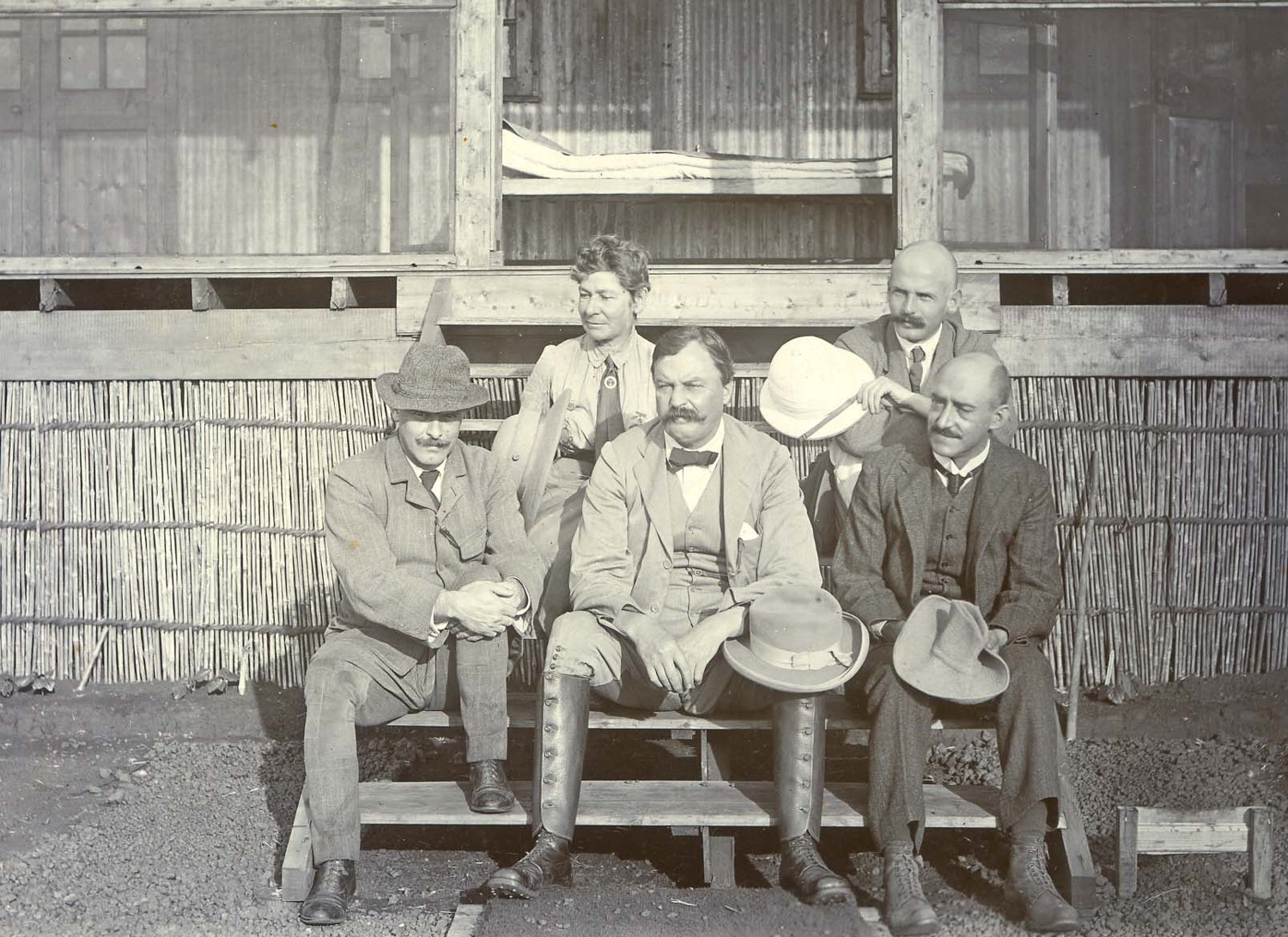
Members of the third Commission (L–R): Percival Mackie, Lady Bruce, Sir David Bruce, H.R. Bateman, A.E. Hamerton

There was an outbreak of sleeping sickness in Uganda from 1900. By 1901, it became severe with death toll estimated to about 20,000. More than 250,000 people died in the epidemic that lasted for two decades. The disease commonly popularised as "negro lethargy" was not known to be related to the fly disease. At the time, the human disease was believed to be either a bacterial infection or helminth infection.

The Royal Society constituted a three-member Sleeping Sickness Commission in 1902 to investigate the epidemic. Led by George Carmichael Low from the London School of Hygiene and Tropical Medicine, the team included his colleague Aldo Castellani and Cuthbert Christy, a medical officer on duty in Bombay, India. The expedition was a failure as they found that bacteria or helminths were not involved in the disease.

The second Commission in 1902 was entrusted to Bruce, assisted by David Nunes Nabarro from the University College Hospital. By August 1903, Bruce and his team established that the disease was transmitted by the tsetse fly, Glossina palpalis. The relationship with the fly disease in animals became obvious. In the third Commission (1908–1912) Bruce and his colleagues established the complete developmental stages of the trypanosome in tsetse fly.

== Honours and awards ==
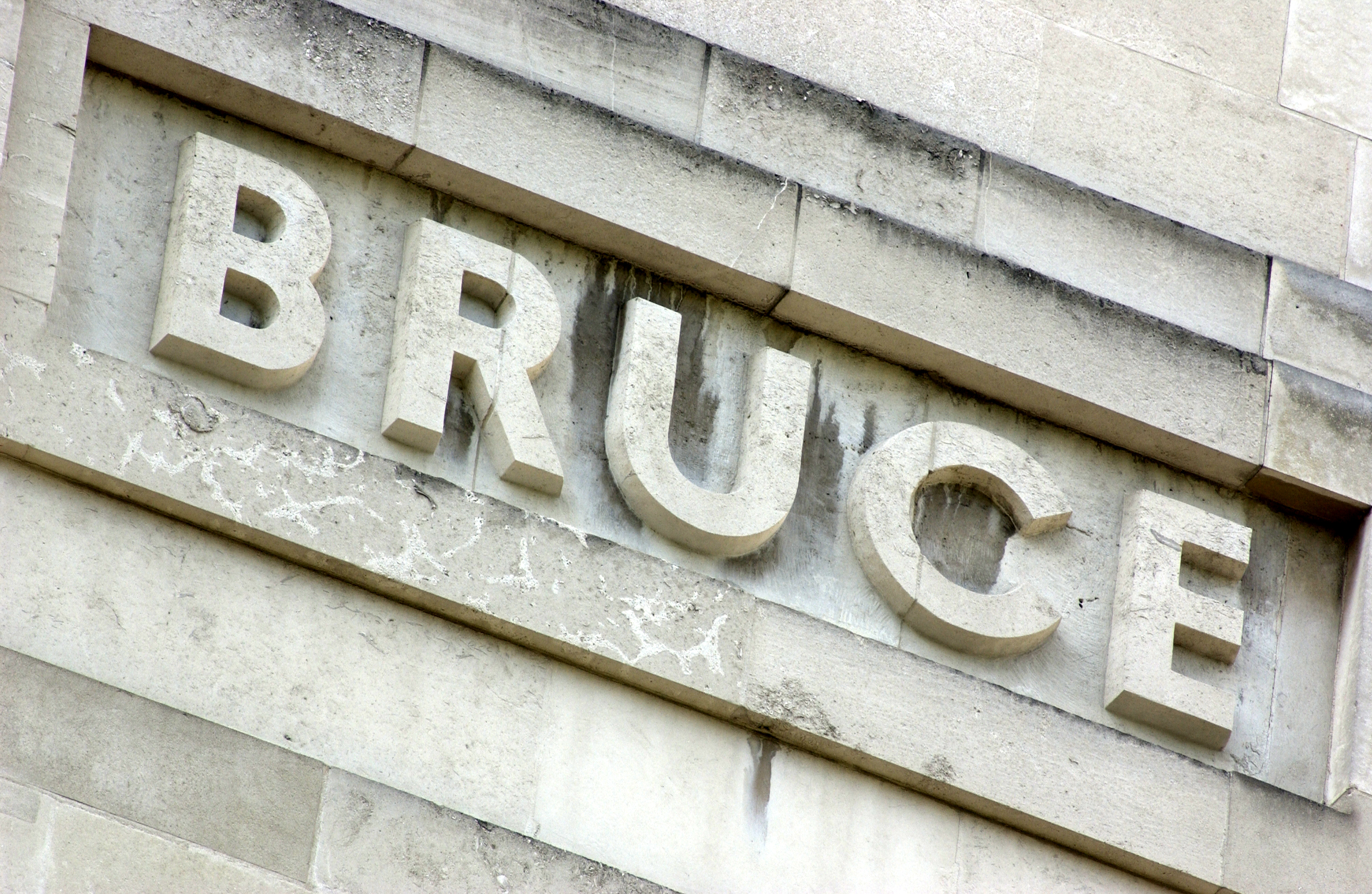
David Bruce's name as it features on the London School of Hygiene & Tropical Medicine

Bruce was elected a Fellow of the Royal Society (FRS) in 1899. He served as editor of the Journal of the Royal Army Medical Corps between 1904 and 1908. He was the recipient of the Cameron Prize from Edinburgh University in 1901. He received the Royal Society's Royal Medal in 1904, the Mary Kingsley Medal in 1905, and the Stewart Prize of the British Medical Association. He was Croonian lecturer at the Royal College of Physicians in 1915. He was awarded the Leeuwenhoek Medal in 1915, created a Companion of the Order of the Bath (CB) in the 1905 Birthday Honours, knighted in 1908 and upgraded to a Knight Commander of the Order of the Bath (KCB) in 1918. He was president of the British Science Association during 1924–1925.

Bruce's name features on the frieze of the London School of Hygiene & Tropical Medicine. Twenty-three names of public health and tropical medicine pioneers were chosen to feature on the School building on Keppel Street when it was constructed in 1926.

Bruce was nominated 31 times for the Nobel Prize in Physiology or Medicine between 1904 and 1932 for his discoveries in trypanosomiasis but was never selected.

== Bibliography ==
- Laval R E (December 2006). "Contribución al estudio histórico de la brucelosis en Chile" [A contribution to historical understanding of brucellosis in Chile]. Revista chilena de infectología (in Spanish). 23 (4): 362–6. doi:10.4067/S0716-10182006000400012. PMID 17186086.
- Pai-Dhungat JV, Parikh F (May 2004). "Sir David Bruce (1855–1931) postal stamps released to commemorate Anti-Brucellosis Congress-Malta 1964". The Journal of the Association of Physicians of India. 52: 428. PMID 15656037.
- Haas LF (April 2001). "Sir David Bruce (1855–1931) and Thermistocles Zammit (1864–1935)". Journal of Neurology, Neurosurgery, and Psychiatry. 70 (4): 520. doi:10.1136/jnnp.70.4.520. PMC 1737312. PMID 11254779.
- Vassallo DJ (September 1996). "The saga of brucellosis: controversy over credit for linking Malta fever with goats' milk". Lancet. 348 (9030): 804–8. doi:10.1016/S0140-6736(96)05470-0. PMID 8813991. S2CID 7966216.
- Grogono BJ (August 1995). "Sir David and Lady Bruce. Part II: further adventures and triumphs". Journal of Medical Biography. 3 (3): 125–32. doi:10.1177/096777209500300301. PMID 11639830. S2CID 27376006.
- Freeling P (June 1995). "The Sir David Bruce Lecture, 1994. A matter of principles". Journal of the Royal Army Medical Corps. 141 (2): 61–9. doi:10.1136/jramc-141-02-02. PMID 7562740.
- Grogono BJ (May 1995). "Sir David and Lady Bruce. Part I: A superb combination in the elucidation and prevention of devastating diseases". Journal of Medical Biography. 3 (2): 79–83. doi:10.1177/096777209500300203. PMID 11640041. S2CID 39272119.
- Evans JA (1993). "Sir David Bruce: the dawn of microbiology". Veterinary History. 7 (3): 105–9. PMID 11639304.
- Carne SJ (June 1991). "Sir David Bruce Lecture 1990. "Heads and tales"". Journal of the Royal Army Medical Corps. 137 (2): 63–8. doi:10.1136/jramc-137-02-02. PMID 1875320.
- Morrell DC (June 1989). "Sir David Bruce memorial lecture 1988". Journal of the Royal Army Medical Corps. 135 (2): 43–8. doi:10.1136/jramc-135-02-02. PMID 2671356.
- Mochmann H, Köhler W (1988). "100 years of bacteriology—history of the discovery of brucellosis. 1: Uncovering the etiology of Malta fever by the British military surgeon David Bruce and the Mediterranean Fever Commission" [100 years of bacteriology—history of the discovery of brucellosis. 1: Uncovering the etiology of Malta fever by the British military surgeon David Bruce and the Mediterranean Fever Commission]. Zeitschrift für ärztliche Fortbildung (in German). 82 (6): 287–90. PMID 3043930.
- Duggan AJ (September 1977). "Bruce and the African Trypanosomes". The American Journal of Tropical Medicine and Hygiene. 26 (5 Pt 2 Suppl): 1080–3. doi:10.4269/ajtmh.1977.26.1080. PMID 20787.
- Boyd J (June 1973). "Sleeping sickness. The Castellani-Bruce controversy". Notes and Records of the Royal Society of London. 28: 93–110. doi:10.1098/rsnr.1973.0008. PMID 11615538. S2CID 37631020.
- ROBERTSON M (April 1956). "Some aspects of trypanosomiasis with particular reference to the work of Sir David Bruce". The Journal of Tropical Medicine and Hygiene. 59 (4): 69–77. PMID 13332700.
- MACARTHUR W (September 1955). "An account of some of Sir David Bruce's researches, based on his own manuscript notes". Transactions of the Royal Society of Tropical Medicine and Hygiene. 49 (5): 404–12. doi:10.1016/0035-9203(55)90003-1. PMID 13267903.
- "Nova et Vetera". British Medical Journal. 1 (4925): 1337. May 1955. doi:10.1136/bmj.1.4925.1337. PMC 2062064. PMID 14363890.
- ROBERTSON M (April 1955). "Sir David Bruce: an appreciation of the man and his work". Journal of the Royal Army Medical Corps. 101 (2): 91–9. PMID 14368591.
- TULLOCH WJ (April 1955). "Sir David Bruce; an appreciation". Journal of the Royal Army Medical Corps. 101 (2): 81–90. PMID 14368590.
- DAVIES M (April 1955). "A bibliography of the work of Sir David Bruce, 1887–1924". Journal of the Royal Army Medical Corps. 101 (2): 122–9. PMID 13248207.
- de Kruif, Paul (1926). "IV Bruce: Trail of the Tsetse". Microbe Hunters. Blue Ribbon Books. New York: Harcourt Brace & Company Inc. pp. 252–277.
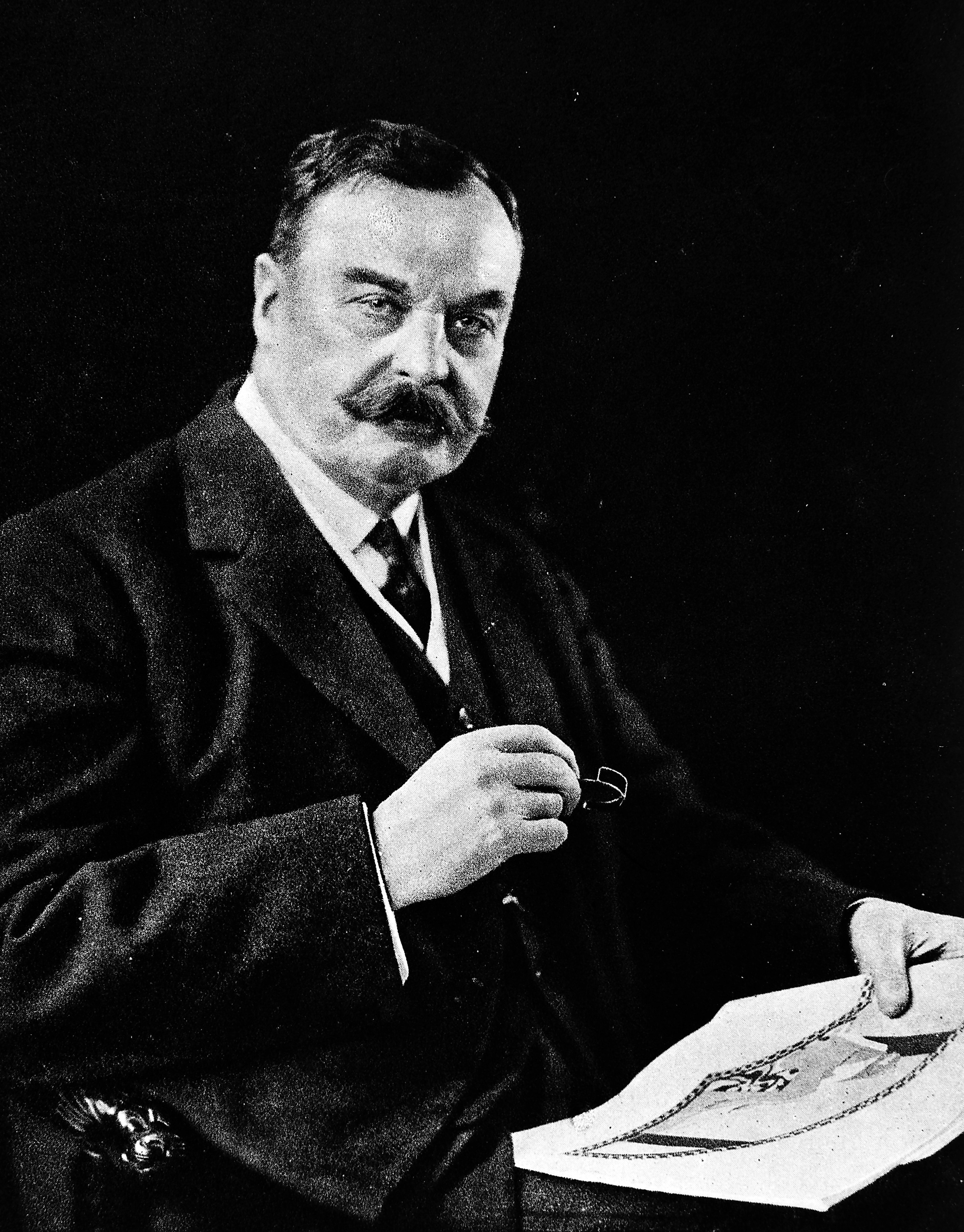

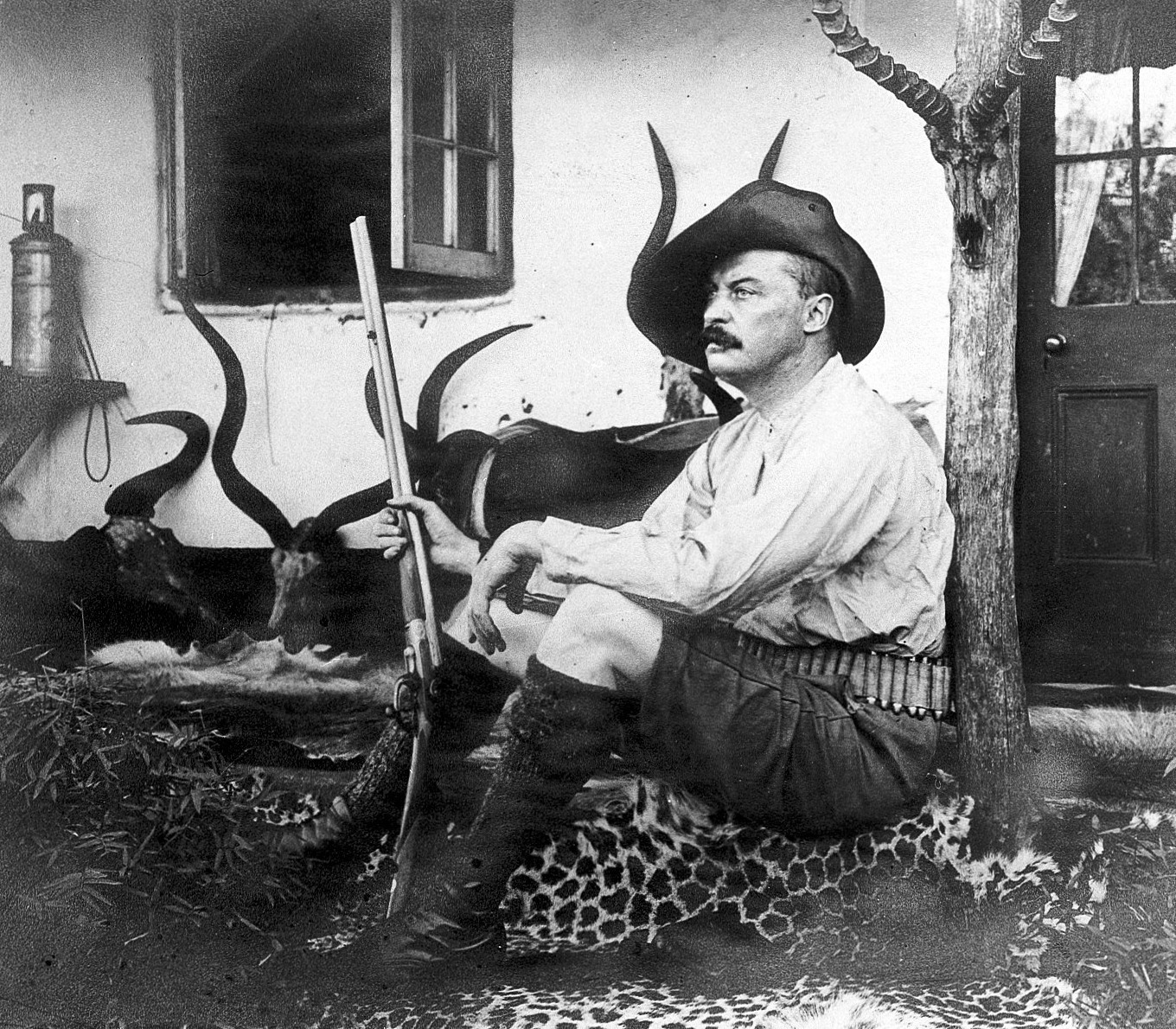
Bruce on the porch of his hut in Ubombo, Zululand (now South Africa), where he discovered Trypanosoma brucei.

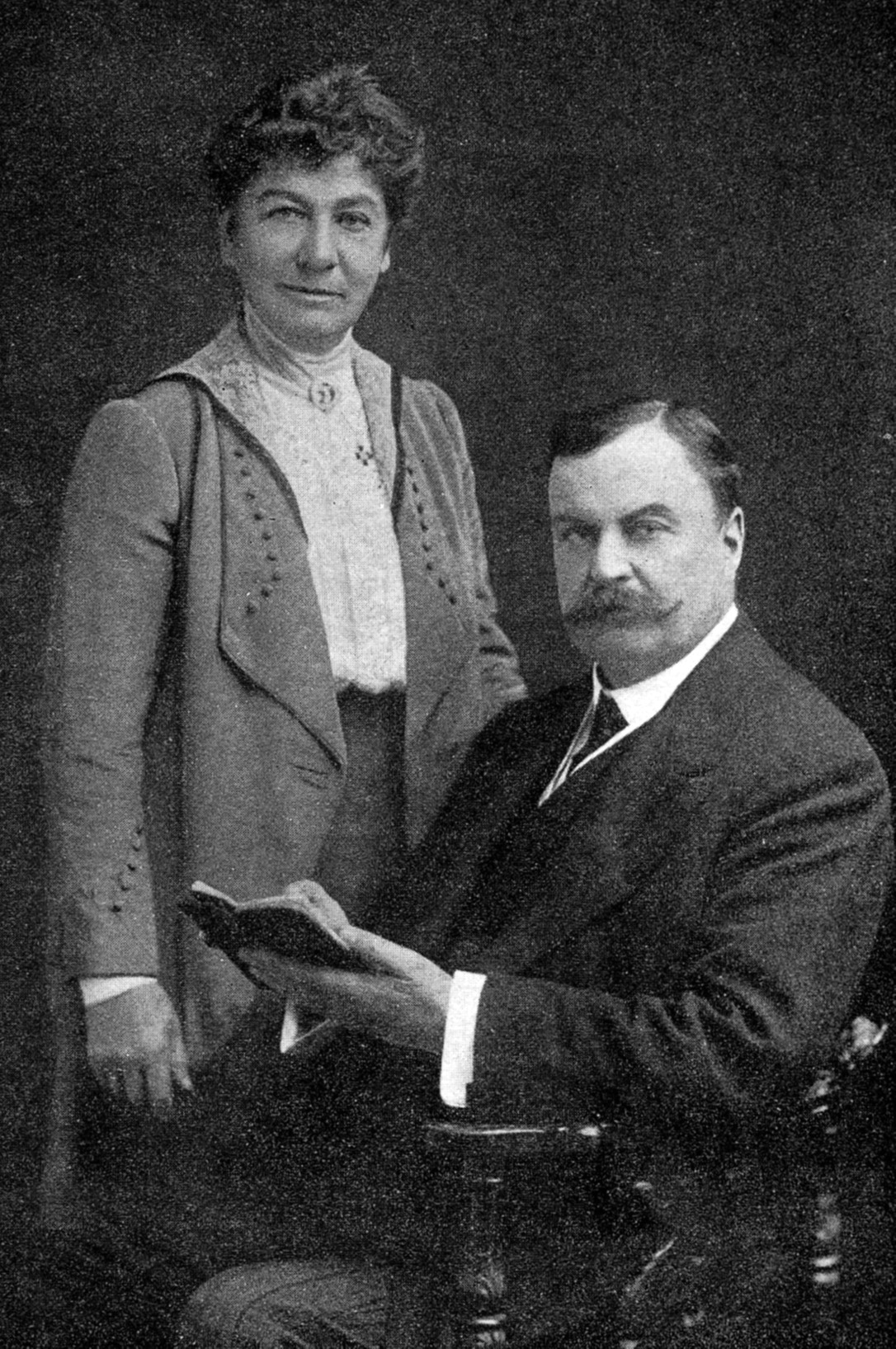
Bruce with wife
