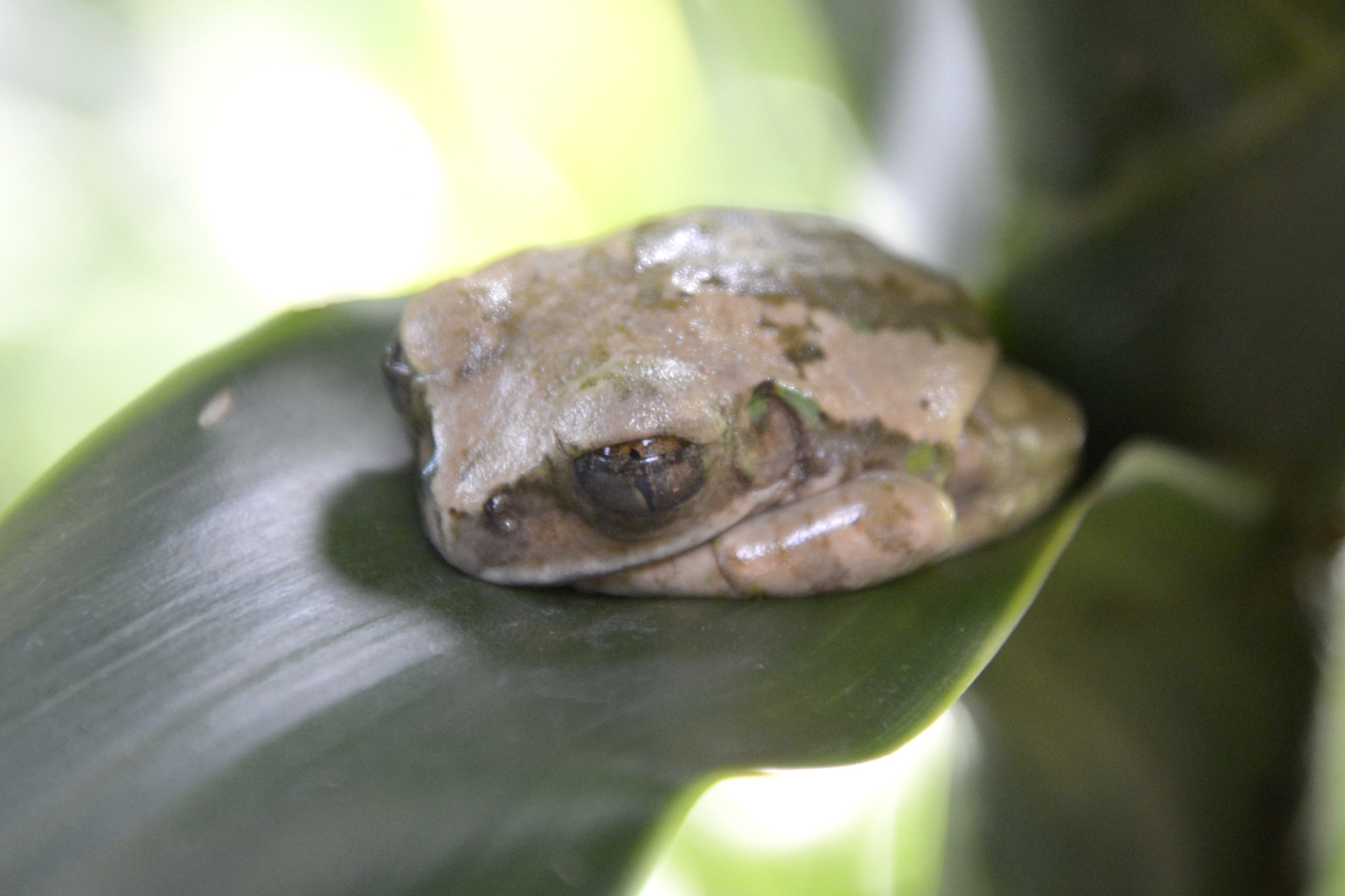
- Yellow-spotted tree frog in the greenhouse of MUSE - Science Museum in Trento

Conservation status
- Least Concern (IUCN 3.1)

Scientific classification
- Kingdom: Animalia
- Phylum: Chordata
- Class: Amphibia
- Order: Anura
- Family: Arthroleptidae
- Genus: Leptopelis
- Species: L. flavomaculatus

Binomial name
- Leptopelis flavomaculatus (Günther, 1864)

Synonyms
- Hyperolius flavomaculatus Günther, 1864; Hylambates johnstoni Boulenger, 1897; Leptopelis barbouri Ahl, 1929

= Leptopelis flavomaculatus =

Species of amphibian

Leptopelis flavomaculatus is a species of frog in the family Arthroleptidae. It is found in the lowlands eastern and southern Africa, from Mozambique north of the Save River and Zimbabwe to Malawi, eastern Tanzania (including the island of Zanzibar), and coastal Kenya. Its common names are yellow-spotted tree frog, brown-backed tree frog, brown forest treefrog, and Johnston's treefrog.

== Taxonomy ==
Leptopelis flavomaculatus was described by Albert Günther in 1864, based on a specimen that he identified as an adult female Hyperolius, but which actually is a juvenile Leptopelis. Its closest relative is Leptopelis christyi. Leptopelis lebeaui might be conspecific with L. flavomaculatus.

=== Leptopelis barbouri ===
The type of Leptopelis barbouri Ahl, 1929 (common name: Barbour's forest treefrog) was in 2014 shown to be conspecific with Leptopelis flavomaculatus, bringing the former into synonymy with the latter. Arthur Loveridge had considered Leptopelis barbouri to be synonym of Leptopelis aubreyi, but in 1975 Arne Schiøtz resurrected it as a valid species. However, in literature between 1975 and 2014, name Leptopelis barbouri has been used for altogether different species that is now known as Leptopelis grandiceps, and which until 2014 was considered a synonym of Leptopelis uluguruensis. In other words, even though Leptopelis barbouri is synonym of Leptopelis flavomaculatus, pre-2014 literature on Leptopelis barbouri actually refers to Leptopelis grandiceps.

== Description ==
Adult males measure 44–50 mm (1.7–2.0 in) and females 60–70 mm (2.4–2.8 in) in snout–vent length. The dorsum is either uniform green with white heels, or brown with a darker, forward-pointing triangle with a blunt apex. There is a dark bar between the eyes and a dark canthal line. Young, green specimens often have yellow spots.

Leptopelis flavomaculatus is similar to Leptopelis vermiculatus but lacks the latter's vermiculated dorsum. It is also similar L. christyi but is larger and its dorsal triangle has a more blunt apex.

== Habitat and conservation ==
The species' natural habitats are lowland and montane evergreen forests, and especially dry forests, at elevations to 1,600 m (5,200 ft) above sea level. It occurs in both pristine and secondary habitats, often along streams, but does not survive in open habitats outside forest. Males can either call from leaves or branches, often at 3–4 m above the ground, or from the mouth of burrows in the ground. Assuming that it is similar to other frogs in its genus, the eggs are laid in a nest near water.

Leptopelis flavomaculatus is often common in suitable habitats. Habitat loss caused by agricultural expansion, logging, and increasing human settlements is, however, a threat. It occurs in several protected areas.
