= David Nunes Nabarro =

British physician

- Born: 27 February 1874; London, England
- Died: 3 October 1958 (aged 84)
- Citizenship: British
- Education: University College Hospital
- Known for: Sleeping Sickness Commission
- Scientific career
- Fields: Pathology
- Workplaces: University College, London; Evelina London Children's Hospital; Great Ormond Street Hospital for Children

David Nunes Nabarro FRCP (27 February 1874 – 3 October 1958) was a British physician who was the first bacteriologist at the Great Ormond Street Hospital for Children in London, and the hospital's first director of pathology. In 1903, he with David Bruce, Aldo Castellani and Cuthbert Christy established that sleeping sickness was caused by the blood parasite, Trypanosoma, and that it was transmitted by tsetse fly.

== Biography ==
Nabarro was born in London to business parents. He was homeschooled till the age of 10. He entered Dame Alice Owen's School in Hertfordshire for secondary education and completed matriculation in 1890. With Andrews Scholarship, he joined the University College Hospital, London, from where he obtained a B.Sc. with honours in chemistry in 1893, at age 19. He qualified an M.B. in 1898 and travelled to the Far East to study tropical diseases. He briefly worked as house physician and demonstrator at UCH.

Nabarro earned an M.D with gold medal in 1899. The same year he joined the faculty of the University College, London as an assistant professor of pathology. As he earned a Doctor of Public Health degree in 1901, he was inducted a member of the Royal College of Physicians, and Membership of the Royal Colleges of Physicians. He immediately worked as the first pathologist at the Evelina London Children's Hospital.

In 1905, Nabarro worked at West Riding Asylum at Wakefield. Before long he was appointed pathologist at the Great Ormond Street Hospital for Children, where he worked till his retirement in 1939.

== Scientific contributions ==
During his studies at University College Hospital, he worked with Leonard Hill of University College, London on the principle of respiration in brain and muscle, the study of which was published in The Journal of Physiology in 1895. While working at UCL, he published papers on the nature of abnormal hearts. He investigated cases of infections with hog cholera, dysentery in children, In 1939, with his assistant Derrick Edward at the Great Ormond Street Hospital for Children, he reported a case of accidental injection malaria in a child.

Nabarro investigated cases of tuberculosis that were spread through contaminated butter in 1905. One of his major research areas was on syphilis in children on which he wrote several papers, and culminated in publication of a classic monograph titled Congenital Syphilis in 1954.

=== Sleeping Sickness Commission ===
The Royal Society constituted the second Sleeping Sickness Commission in the early 1903. Nabarro was appointed "Head of the Commission" on 5 January. But Nabarro, on concern that he was not senior to the other members in age and service, asked the Royal Society to make someone else as the head. Upon the request of the Royal Society, the British War Office appointed David Bruce of the Royal Army Medical Corps was then appointed leader of the team in February. Bruce and Nabarro joined Castellani and Christy on 16 March. The Commission successfully investigated the etiology of the disease as an infection with the protozoan parasite known as Trypanosoma gambiense. By August 1903, Bruce and his team established that the disease was transmitted by the tsetse fly, Glossina palpalis.

== Awards and honours ==
Nabarro was elected member of The Physiological Society in 1897, and Fellow of the University College Hospital in 1900. He became Fellow of the Royal College of Physicians in 1917.
