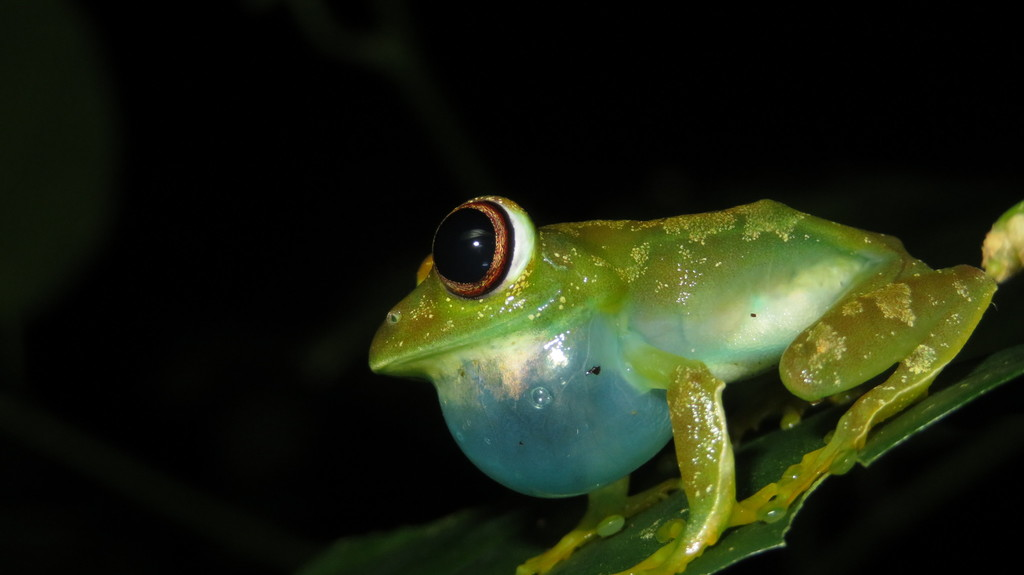

Conservation status
- Vulnerable (IUCN 3.1)

Scientific classification
- Kingdom: Animalia
- Phylum: Chordata
- Class: Amphibia
- Order: Anura
- Family: Arthroleptidae
- Genus: Leptopelis
- Species: L. grandiceps

Binomial name
- Leptopelis grandiceps Ahl, 1929

= Leptopelis grandiceps =

Species of frog

Leptopelis grandiceps, the large headed forest treefrog, is a species of small tree frog. Females are thought to be larger than males based on the male lectotype and female allotype. They are endemic to the Eastern Arc Mountains in Tanzania, where they inhabit forests near a water source. It's closely related to L. barbouri and L. uluguruensis. It's listed Vulnerable on the IUCN Red List and populations are thought to be decreasing. Notably, L. grandiceps has a controversial nomenclature history.

== Nomenclature ==
L. grandiceps has a convoluted nomenclature history. Most of which is due to renaming and reclassifying frogs without examining the frog collection/type.

A collection of frogs (2 adult females and 9 juveniles) were initially identified as L. aubryi, but later controversially differentiated into a new species called L. barbouri. This was done after the collection was described in greater detail than the original description by an author, Ahl (1929), who had never seen the collection.

Later, Schiøtz (1975) added some males from the Dabaga forest to the L. barbouri collection which looked different from the females in the original collection. He hypothesised that the morphological differences might be due to sexual dimorphism or population-level differentiation and referred to them as L. barbouri.

Later, a study ( Gvoždík, Tillack, Menegon, and Loader, 2014) found that the female type of L. barbouri was morphologically very different from what is today commonly referred to as L. barbouri. The females were in fact Leptopelis flavomaculatus. However, the male specimens Schiøtz collected from Dabaga were morphologically identical to unnamed specimens from other publications (e.g. Harper & Vonesh 2002; Channing & Howell 2006; Pickersgill 2007; Harper et al. 2010).

The name L. grandiceps was originally assigned to two specimens collected by J. Vosseler. Eventually, L. grandiceps became a synonym for L.uluguruensis. Controversially, this synonymization done by Loveridge (1975), was solely based on the description as he had never actually examined the specimens. These specimens are an example of frogs who are the same species as Schiøtz's Dabaga collection. Subsequently, the name Leptopelis grandiceps was available and applied to these frogs.

As of October 2023, the lectotype (male) and the allotype/paratype (female) are located at the ZMB (Museum für Naturkunde Berlin, formerly Zoologisches Museum Berlin). The holotype and other specimens can be found at the BMNH (Natural History Museum, London)

== Development ==
Although the exact developmental patterns of L. grandiceps are unknown, it is thought that frogs that live in montane forests are more likely to have complete terrestrial development. This is likely due to the presence of fast-flowing streams.

== Behaviour and communication ==
Males make mating calls from the top of branches near streams. The sound is distinct from other similar-looking Leptopelis as is described as such: The voice is a brief buzzing with an indistinct frequency-intensity maximum at about 1500 cps. and a rate of about 100 figures per second (Schiotz 2014). Furthermore, They have been found buried in mud near streams with only their heads visible above ground. They can also be found in elevations up to 2,100 m (6,900 ft), with a minimum elevation of 180 m (590 ft).

== Reproduction ==
Just 10 m (33 ft) from a tiny stream, a frog pair was discovered mating, and their heads were only apparent in the sinking earth in which they were mating in.

Although the exact developmental patterns of L. grandiceps are unknown, it is believed that terrestrial breeding and egg laying are associated with the frogs inhabiting montane forests, likely due to the presence of fast-flowing streams.

== Geographic range and habitat ==
L. grandiceps's geographic range includes the Eastern Arc Mountains and Southern Highlands in Tanzania and Kenya. They inhabit humid montane and lowland rainforests. However, until more thorough genetic analyses are conducted, Gvoždík et al. (2014) proposed that L. grandiceps should only include populations in East Usambara mountains and L. cf. grandiceps should be tentatively used for populations in other locations.

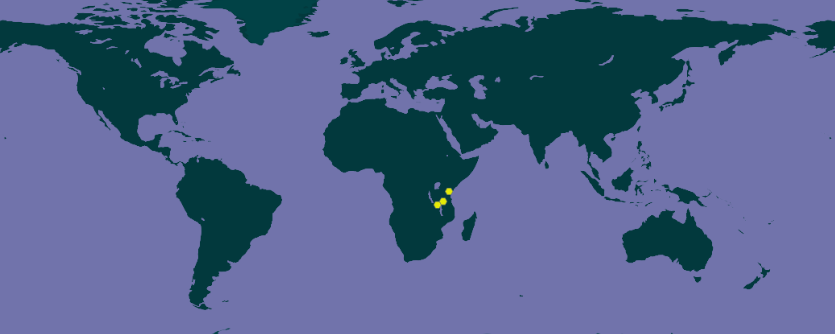
GBIF georeferenced records of L. grandiceps as of 2023-10-30

== Physical description ==
Adult L. grandiceps are slender with pointed snouts and large heads. The tympanum is distinctly small, spanning 1/3-2/5 of the horizontal diameter of the eye. The toes are 1/2 webbed ending with large disks in both the manual and pedal digits. The inner metatarsal tubercles are small ovoid and non prominent. Subarticular tubercles are somewhat prominent. Their skin is a bright translucent green with light coloured patches on the frog's lower jaw. They occasionally have light coloured small dots on their skin as well. Males are considered small (30–33mm) while females medium (39–45mm). The heads are wider than they are long and contain large protruding eyes. Eyes are light coloured with orange patches and black vermiculation.

Currently, the tadpoles have not been described.

== Socioeconomic relevance and history ==
L. grandiceps is not commonly encountered so there is little socioeconomic relevance.

The history of naming L. grandiceps could be considered relevant and controversial in the scientific community. This is because synonymizations and namings were done without seeing the type or collections.

== Genomic information ==
There are currently two sequences on GenBank for L. grandiceps. One being the partial coding sequence of the COI gene. The other sequence is a partial sequence of the 16S ribosomal RNA gene.

== Unknowns ==
Little is known of L. grandiceps diet, predators, lifespan, or ecosystem role and niche.
