= Sleeping Sickness Commission =

Former British medical project

The Sleeping Sickness Commission was a medical project established by the British Royal Society to investigate the outbreak of African sleeping sickness or African trypanosomiasis in Africa at the turn of the 20th century. The outbreak of the disease started in 1900 in Uganda, which was at the time a protectorate of the British Empire. The initial team in 1902 consisted of Aldo Castellani and George Carmichael Low, both from the London School of Hygiene and Tropical Medicine, and Cuthbert Christy, a medical officer on duty in Bombay, India. From 1903, David Bruce of the Royal Army Medical Corps and David Nunes Nabarro of the University College Hospital took over the leadership. The commission established that species of blood protozoan called Trypanosoma brucei, named after Bruce, was the causative parasite of sleeping sickness.

== Background ==
Symptoms of sleeping sickness in animals were evident in ancient Egyptian writings. Records of Arabian traders in the Middle Ages mentioned the prevalence of sleeping sickness among Africans and their dogs. Sultan Mari Jata, emperor of Mali, was said to die of the disease. It remained one of the major infectious diseases in southern and eastern Africa in the 19th century. It caused constant threats to cattle and horses in southern Africa such as the Zulu Kingdom. The Zulu people called this animal disease nagana (which means "to be low or depressed in spirit") which became a popular name in Africa; while some Europeans referred to its as the "fly disease."

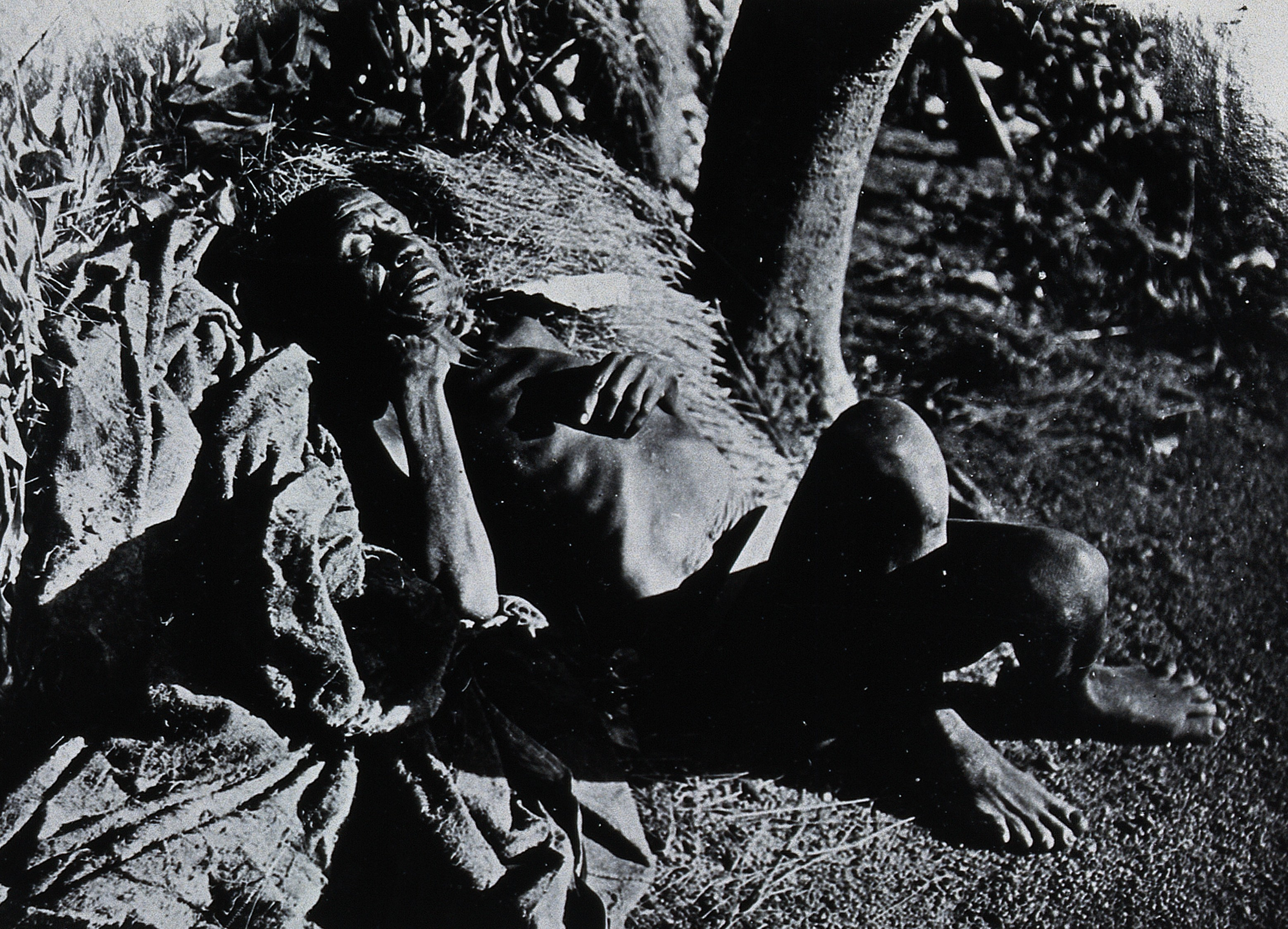
A man having sleeping sickness at Buruma Island, Uganda.

The first medical description of human sleeping sickness was given by English naval surgeon John Aktins in 1734. Atkins described the neurological symptoms, meaning the late stages of infection, among the natives of Guinea referring to the cause of deaths as "sleepy distemper." In 1803, another English physician Thomas Winterbottom gave more elaborate symptoms including the different pathological disorders due to the infection in Sierra Leone. An important diagnosis recorded by Winterbottom was swollen posterior cervical lymph nodes that were visible since the early stage of infection. Slaves who developed such swellings were unfit for trade. The symptom has been named "Winterbottom's sign."

Starting from 1900 and lasting for two decades, there was an outbreak of human sleeping sickness in Uganda. The outbreak originated in the Busoga kingdom in eastern Uganda. The first case of human infection was recorded in 1898. It was particularly severe in 1901, with death toll estimated to about 20,000. More than 250,000 people died in the epidemic. The disease was then known as the "negro lethargy."

== Initial discoveries ==
=== Disease carrier ===
Scottish missionary and explorer David Livingstone was the first to suggest that sleeping sickness in animals was transmitted by the bite of tsetse fly. His 1852 report mentioned that cattle he used in the valleys of the Limpopo River and Zambezi River and at the banks of the Lake Malawi and Lake Tanganyika had sleeping sickness after exposure to tsetse flies. He made an experimental observation on cattle bitten by tsetse flies, which he described in his 1857 report, saying:

[The] animal continues to graze, emaciation commences, accompanied with a peculiar flaccidity of the muscles, and this proceeds unchecked until, perhaps months afterward, purging comes on, and the animal, no longer able to graze, perishes in a state of extreme exhaustion. Those which are in good condition often perish soon after the bite is inflicted with staggering and blindness, as if the brain were affected by it... These symptoms seem to indicate what is probably the cause, a poison in the blood, the germ of which enters when the proboscis is inserted to draw blood. The poison-germ, contained in a bulb at the root of the proboscis, seems capable, although very minute in quantity, of reproducing itself, for the blood after death by tsetse is very small in quantity, and scarcely stains the hands in dissection.

Livingstone further made experiments to cure infection in horses using arsenic as he reported in The British Medical Journal in 1858.

=== Animal sleeping sickness ===
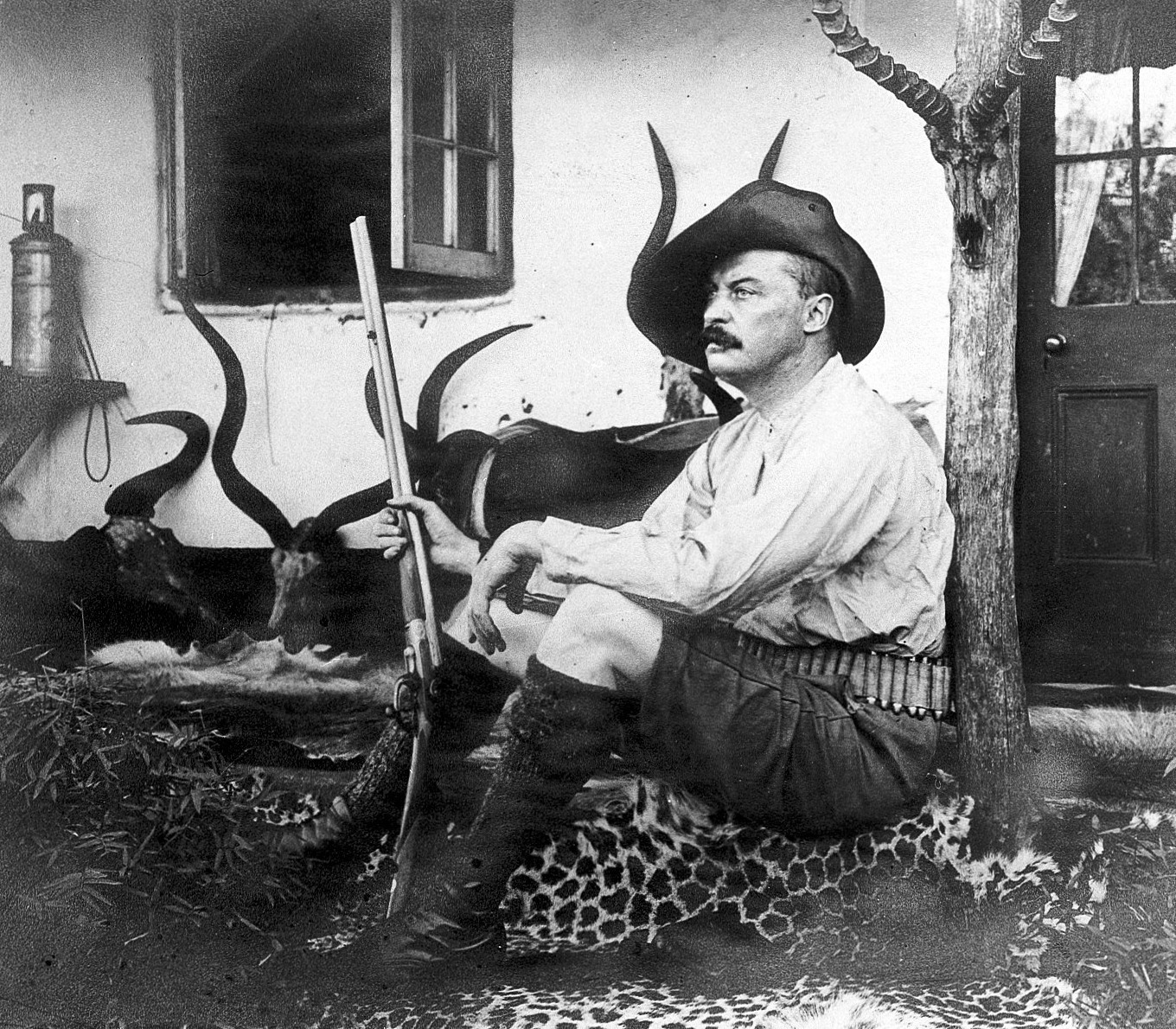
Sir David Bruce on the porch of his hut in Ubombo, Zululand (now South Africa), where he discovered Trypanosoma brucei.

Scottish physician David Bruce, while working in the Royal Army Medical Corps stationed at Pietermaritzburg, Natal, South Africa, was assigned to investigate nagana which severely struck cattle and horses in Zululand. On 27 October 1894, he and his wife Mary Elizabeth Bruce (née Steele), who was also a microbiologist, moved to Ubombo Hill, where the disease was most prevalent. He discovered protozoan parasites from the blood of infected animals. It was the discovery of Trypanosoma brucei, the name created by Henry George Plimmer and John Rose Bradford in 1899 in honour of the discoverer. The genus Trypanosoma was created by Hungarian physician David Gruby in his description of T. sanguinis, a species he discovered from the blood of frogs in 1843. How the infection was transmitted in animals and its relation to human sleeping sickness were not known.

=== The first human trypanosome ===
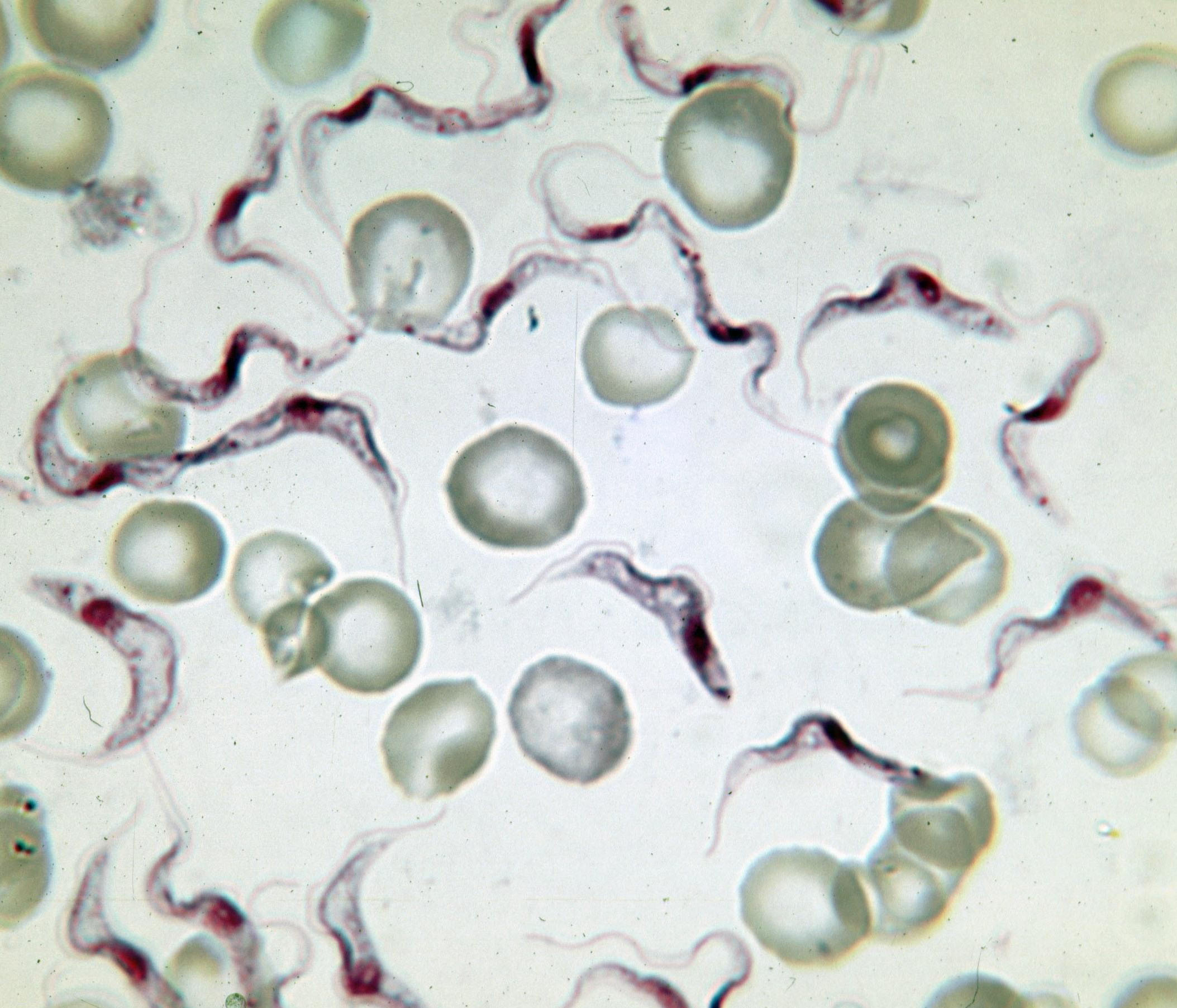
Trypanosoma brucei, the causative protozoan of African sleeping sickness.

On 10 May 1901, an English steamboat captain was admitted to a hospital at Bathurst, Gambia, due to high fever. British Colonial Surgeon Robert Michael Forde examined the blood samples and identified some organisms which he attributed as parasitic worms. He reported his observation in 1902. After recovery, the same person was admitted to the same hospital again in December 1901. Forde asked Joseph Everett Dutton, a parasitologist on expedition who was visiting the hospital at that time. Forde described the causative infection as "very many actively moving worm-like bodies whose nature he was unable to ascertain" from his original diagnosis to Dutton. Dutton prepared several blood smears from which he concluded that the parasites were protozoans belonging to the genus Trypanosoma, yet distinct in structure and disease it caused from those of known species at the time. In his report in 1902, he made a concluding suggestion:

At present then it is impossible to decide definitely as to the species, but if on further study it should be found to differ from other disease-producing trypanosomes I would suggest that it be called Trypanosoma gambiense.

== The Commission ==
The matter of Uganda epidemic was discussed in the Council of the Royal Society in 1902. At that time there was an international debate on the etiology of sleeping sickness with many favouring a contagious nature since the infection was spreading fast. Plans for investigation was placed in the hands of the Royal Society Malaria Committee. As proposed by Patrick Manson, the most suitable investigators were Aldo Castellani and George Carmichael Low, both from the London School of Hygiene and Tropical Medicine as former students of Manson, and Cuthbert Christy, a medical officer on duty in Bombay, India. The Royal Society made the three-member Sleeping Sickness Commission on 10 May 1902.

=== The first Commission ===
Low was appointed as leader the first Commission. He was assigned to look for Filaria perstans (later renamed Mansonella perstans), a small roundworm transmitted by flies, as a possible cause of sleeping sickness. Low had previously in 1901 established that another roundworm Filaria bancrofti (later renamed Wuchereria bancrofti, which was the cause of elephantiasis in humans). Since the initial discovery of Manson in 1878 that F. bancrofti was transmitted by mosquitos (Culex quinquefasciatus), it was believed that roundworms and mosquitos were associated with the sleeping sickness. This was the main reason the Royal Society put the matter under its Malaria Committee. Castellani was assigned to investigate a bacterium, Streptococcus, as another possible etiology; while Christy was to make epidemiological studies.

The team arrived at Entebbe and set up a laboratory there in July 1902. Initially the laboratory was planned to set up at Jinja, which is closer to Busoga, where the outbreak occurred. But Entebbe was chosen for administrative reason and partly due to report of filaria in the region. There were frictions between the team members, and Christy, who was regarded as playing only a minor role, resorted to idling his time trekking and hunting. The team was described as an "ill-assorted group" and a "queer lot", and the expedition "a failure." Low, whose character was described as "truculent and prone to take offence," was soon dejected by the fact that filaria was not prevalent among the people with sleeping sickness, left Africa in October 1902, never to return.

=== The second Commission ===
In 1901, the Portuguese government sent their own Sleeping Sickness Commission in Angola. By 1902, they claimed that there was evidence of infection with the bacterium (Streptococcus) in many clinical cases of sleeping sickness. This encouraged Castellani in his line of investigation and soon also claimed to have identified the bacterial infection. He sent a preliminary report titled "The etiology of sleeping sickness (Preliminary note)" to the Royal Society on 14 October 1902 (which was published in The Lancet in March 1903). He noted that he had "good reason to consider [the bacterium] to be the cause of sleeping sickness."

The Royal Society was not convinced of Castellani's report and constituted the second Commission in the early 1903 to resolve the matter. David Nunes Nabarro of the University College Hospital, was appointed "Head of the Commission" on 5 January. But Nabarro, on concern that he was not senior to the other members in age and service, asked the Royal Society to make someone else as the head. Upon the request of the Royal Society, the British War Office appointed David Bruce of the Royal Army Medical Corps was then appointed leader of the team in February. Bruce and Nabarro joined Castellani and Christy on 16 March. The Commission terminated in August as Bruce left Africa with successful investigation.

=== The third Commission ===
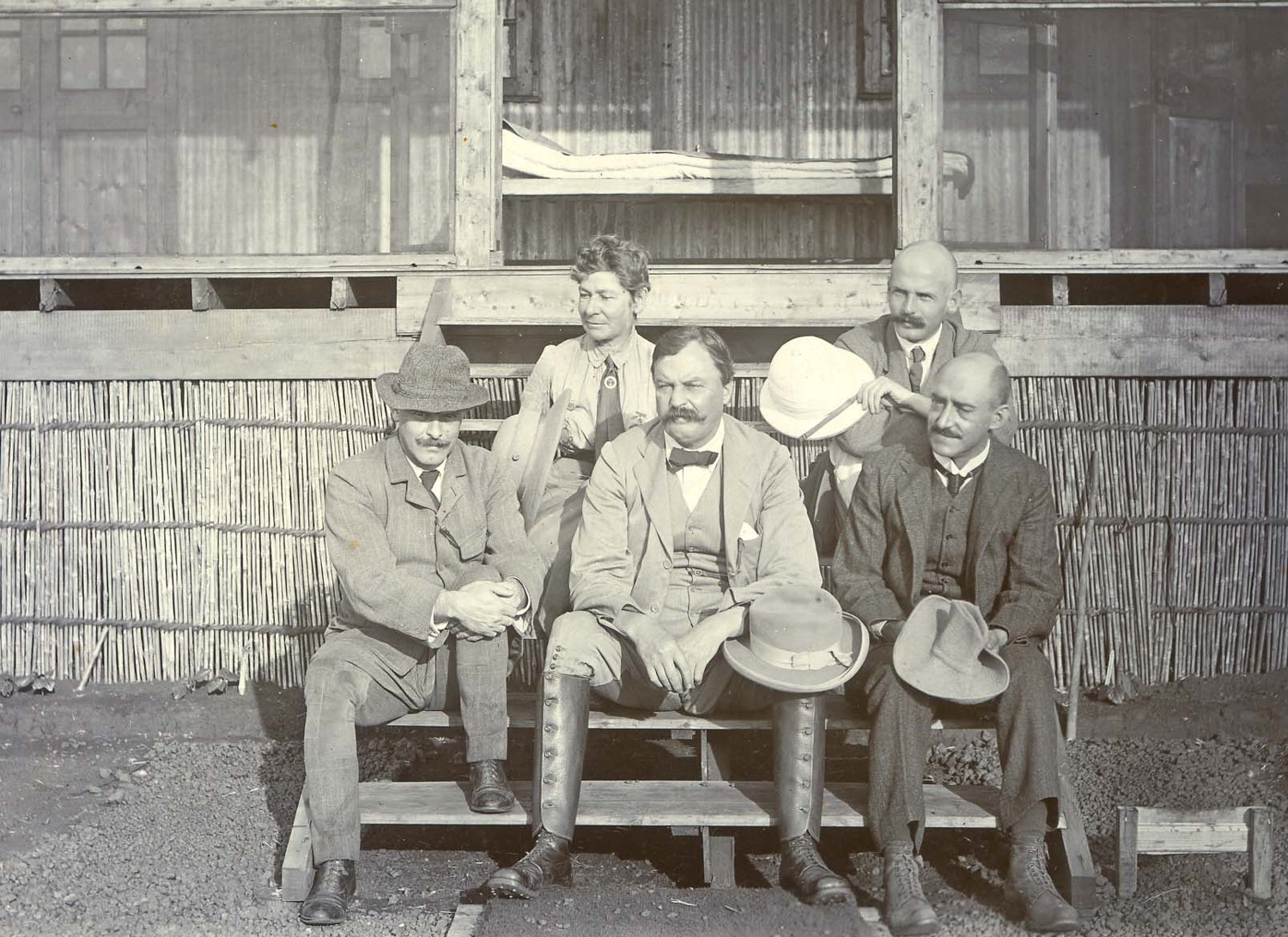
Members of the third Commission (L–R): Percival Mackie, Lady Bruce, Sir David Bruce, H.R. Bateman, A.E. Hamerton.

The third Commission was organised between 1908 and 1912, headed by Bruce, and supported by Albert Ernest Hamerton, H.R. Bateman and Frederick Percival Mackie. By that time the German government had similar commission led by Robert Koch to investigate the outbreak in East Africa. Koch's associate, Friedrich Karl Kleine discovered that tsetse flies were the carriers of the protozoan parasite. Bruce's Commission confirmed that the infection was transmitted by the tsetse fly, Glossina palpalis. They also established the developmental process of the parasite in the tsetse fly.
