= Greenwoodochromis =

Scientific classification
- Kingdom: Animalia
- Phylum: Chordata
- Class: Actinopterygii
- Division: Teleostei
- Order: Cichliformes
- Family: Cichlidae
- Subfamily: Pseudocrenilabrinae
- Tribe: Greenwoodochromini; Takahashi, 2003
- Genus: Greenwoodochromis; Poll, 1983

Type species
- Limnochromis christyi Trewavas, 1953

Synonyms
- Lepidochromis Poll, 1981

Genus of fishes

Greenwoodochromis is a small genus of cichlid fish that are endemic to Lake Tanganyika in Africa. It is the only genus in the monotypic tribe Greenwoodochromini, however, some authorities have synonymised the Greenwoodochromini with the tribe Limnochromini.

The generic name is a compound noun, made up of the surname Greenwood, in honour of the British ichthyologist Peter Humphry Greenwood (1927-1995), and the Greek word chromis which was used by Aristotle for a type of fish. This was probably the drum Sciaenidae and may be derived from the word chroemo which means "to neigh" in reference to the noise made by drums. This word was applied to a number of percomorph fishes, such as damselfish, cardinalfish, dottybacks, wrasses and cichilds, by ichthyologists as these were thought to be closely related.

== Species ==
There are currently four recognized species in this genus:

- Greenwoodochromis abeelei (Poll, 1949)
- Greenwoodochromis bellcrossi (Poll, 1976)
- Greenwoodochromis christyi (Trewavas, 1953)
- Greenwoodochromis staneri (Poll, 1949)
