= Greenwoodochromis staneri =

Conservation status
- Least Concern (IUCN 3.1)

Scientific classification
- Kingdom: Animalia
- Phylum: Chordata
- Class: Actinopterygii
- Division: Teleostei
- Order: Cichliformes
- Family: Cichlidae
- Genus: Greenwoodochromis
- Species: G. staneri

Binomial name
- Greenwoodochromis staneri (Poll, 1949)

Synonyms
- Limnochromis staneri Poll, 1949

Species of fish

Greenwoodochromis staneri is a species of cichlid endemic to Lake Tanganyika where it occurs in the southern portion of the lake. This species can reach a length of 19 centimetres (7.5 in) TL. The specific name honours the Belgian colonial administrator P. Staner who provided translations for the Belgian Hydrobiological Mission to Lake Tanganyika (1946-1947), on which type was collected.
