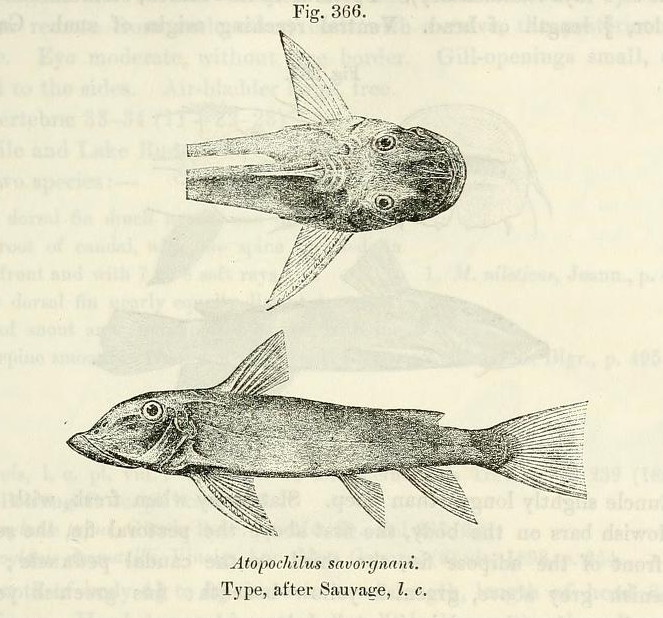
- Atopochilus savorgnani

Scientific classification
- Kingdom: Animalia
- Phylum: Chordata
- Class: Actinopterygii
- Order: Siluriformes
- Family: Mochokidae
- Genus: Atopochilus; Sauvage, 1879

Type species
- Atopochilus savorgnani Sauvage, 1879

= Atopochilus =

Genus of fishes

Atopochilus is a genus of upside-down catfishes native to Africa.

== Species ==
Seven species currently are recognized in this genus:

- Atopochilus chabanaudi Pellegrin, 1938
- Atopochilus christyi Boulenger, 1920
- Atopochilus macrocephalus Boulenger, 1906
- Atopochilus mandevillei Poll, 1959
- Atopochilus pachychilus Pellegrin, 1924
- Atopochilus savorgnani Sauvage, 1879
- Atopochilus vogti Pellegrin, 1922

== Description ==
Atopochilus species have their lips and barbels modified into a suckermouth. Atopochilus species range in size from 6.0 to 14.1 cm (2.4 to 5.6 in) in standard length.
