= Atopochilus mandevillei =

Conservation status
- Data Deficient (IUCN 3.1)

Scientific classification
- Kingdom: Animalia
- Phylum: Chordata
- Class: Actinopterygii
- Order: Siluriformes
- Family: Mochokidae
- Genus: Atopochilus
- Species: A. mandevillei

Binomial name
- Atopochilus mandevillei Poll, 1959

Species of fish

Atopochilus mandevillei is a species of upside-down catfish endemic to the Democratic Republic of the Congo where it occurs in the Kinsuka Rapids. This species grows to a length of 14.1 centimetres (5.6 in) TL.

== Etymology ==
The catfish is named in honor of J. Th. Mandeville, a fisheries agent working for the government of Leopoldville, now known as Kinshasa, Democratic Republic of the Congo, who collected some of the species paratype specimens.
