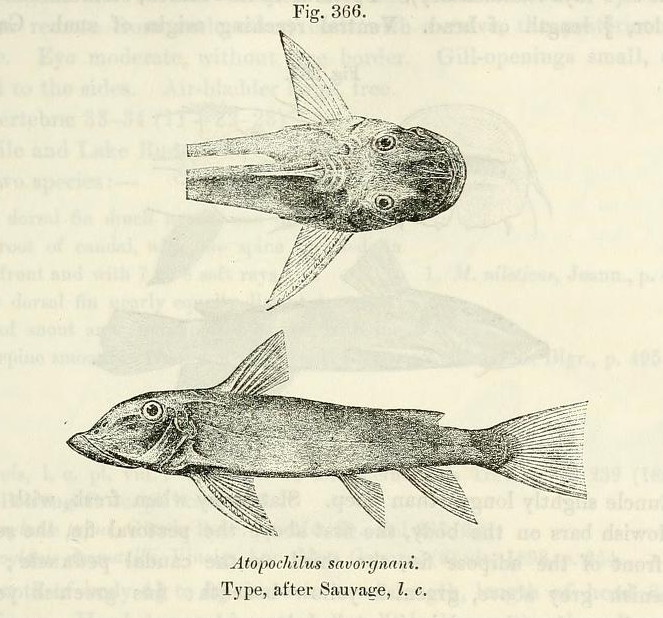

Conservation status
- Least Concern (IUCN 3.1)

Scientific classification
- Domain: Eukaryota
- Kingdom: Animalia
- Phylum: Chordata
- Class: Actinopterygii
- Order: Siluriformes
- Family: Mochokidae
- Genus: Atopochilus
- Species: A. savorgnani

Binomial name
- Atopochilus savorgnani Sauvage, 1879

= Atopochilus savorgnani =

Species of fish

Atopochilus savorgnani is a species of upside-down catfish native to Cameroon where it is found in the Ntem River, Equatorial Guinea where it occurs in Río Muni and Gabon where it is found in the upper Ogowe River.

This species grows to a length of 9 centimetres (3.5 in) SL.

== Etymology ==
The catfish is named in honor of Italian explorer Pietro Paolo Savorgnan di Brazzà (1852-1905), who explored the Ogooué River of Gabon (type locality); under French colonial rule, the capital of the Republic of the Congo was named Brazzaville after him and retained by post-colonial rulers.
