= Atopochilus pachychilus =

Conservation status
- Data Deficient (IUCN 3.1)

Scientific classification
- Kingdom: Animalia
- Phylum: Chordata
- Class: Actinopterygii
- Order: Siluriformes
- Family: Mochokidae
- Genus: Atopochilus
- Species: A. pachychilus

Binomial name
- Atopochilus pachychilus Pellegrin, 1924

Species of fish

Atopochilus pachychilus is a species of upside-down catfish endemic to the Democratic Republic of the Congo where it occurs in the Lubilonji River in the vicinity of Kanda Kanda. This species grows to a length of 8.5 centimetres (3.3 in) TL.
