= Atopochilus vogti =

Conservation status
- Data Deficient (IUCN 3.1)

Scientific classification
- Kingdom: Animalia
- Phylum: Chordata
- Class: Actinopterygii
- Order: Siluriformes
- Family: Mochokidae
- Genus: Atopochilus
- Species: A. vogti

Binomial name
- Atopochilus vogti Pellegrin, 1922

Species of fish

Atopochilus vogti is a species of upside-down catfish endemic to Tanzania, where it occurs in the Wami River. This species grows to a total length of 12.6 cm (5.0 in) .

== Etymology ==
The catfish is named in honor of Monsignor Franz Xaver Vogt (1870-1943), who was a German Catholic missionary in Bagamoyo, German East Africa, which is now Tanzania, who sent the type specimen to the Muséum national d'Histoire naturelle in Paris.
