= Aristochromis =

Conservation status
- Least Concern (IUCN 3.1)

Scientific classification
- Kingdom: Animalia
- Phylum: Chordata
- Class: Actinopterygii
- Order: Cichliformes
- Family: Cichlidae
- Genus: Aristochromis; Trewavas, 1935
- Species: A. christyi

Binomial name
- Aristochromis christyi Trewavas, 1935

Genus of fishes

Aristochromis christyi is a species of fish in the family Cichlidae, which is endemic to Lake Malawi in Africa. It is the only known member of its genus.

== Description ==
A. christyi has an elongated body and an enlarged, bulbous head. The female and juvenile A, christyi are similar to each other in colour having mainly silvery bodies marked with longitudinal black lines one from which runs from the nape to the tail and with the other along the base of the dorsal fin. As the males reach sexual maturity they lose their stripes and the body colour changes to blue, at the same time the ventral fins change colour to orange in the breeding season. This large, predatory fish grows to a length of 30 centimetres (12 in) total length.

== Distribution and habitat ==
It is found in Malawi, Mozambique, and Tanzania where it is endemic to Lake Malawi. Within Lake Malawi A. christyi is a widespread species being found in areas where more rocky habitat gives way to sand,

== Biology ==
This is a piscivorous species and its main prey consists of other cichlid species, eating any prey which can fit into its mouth. To feed A. christyi searches among rocks and when it finds prey it turns sideways and puts its sizeable, laterally compressed mandibles into rocky cracks capturing any small fish which may be hiding among the rocks. Both males and females are territorial and solitary but females will enter male held territories to spawn, the males are polygamous and the eggs and young are mouthbrooded by the female.

== Name ==
The specific name honours the English doctor and zoologist Cuthbert Christy (1863–1932), the collector of the type.
