= Greenwoodochromis abeelei =

Conservation status
- Least Concern (IUCN 3.1)

Scientific classification
- Kingdom: Animalia
- Phylum: Chordata
- Class: Actinopterygii
- Division: Teleostei
- Order: Cichliformes
- Family: Cichlidae
- Genus: Greenwoodochromis
- Species: G. abeelei

Binomial name
- Greenwoodochromis abeelei (Poll, 1949)

Synonyms
- Limnochromis abeelei Poll, 1949

Species of fish

Greenwoodochromis abeelei is a species of cichlid endemic to Lake Tanganyika where it occurs in deeper waters in the southern portion of the lake. This species can reach a length of 23.5 centimetres (9.3 in) TL. It was formerly placed in the genus Limnochromis. The specific name honours the Belgian colonial administrator M.M. van den Abeele who supported the Belgian Hydrobiological Mission to Lake Tanganyika (1946-1947), on which type was collected.
