= Aldo Castellani =

Italian microbiologist (1874–1971)

Aldo Castellani KCMG
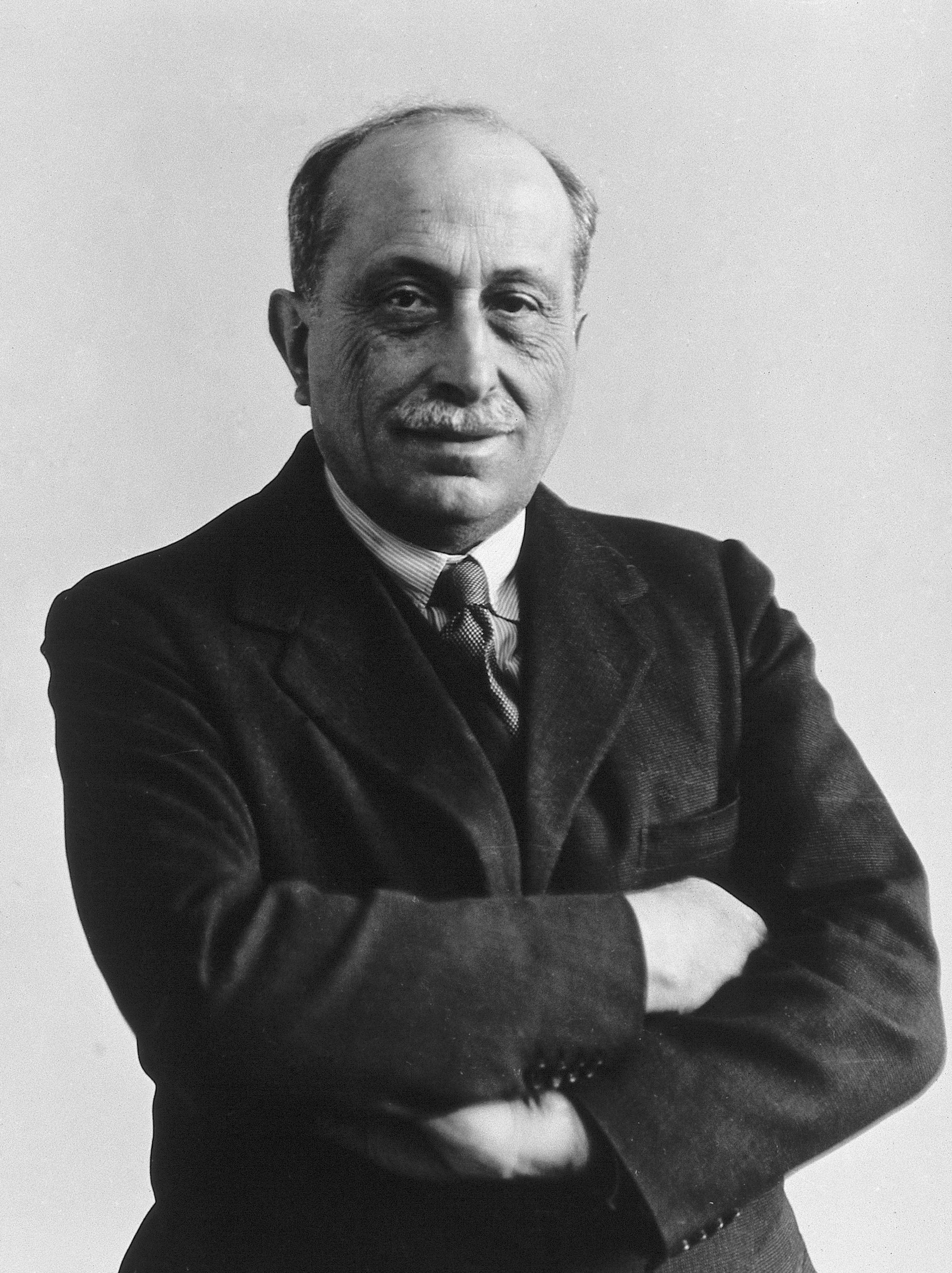
- Castellani in 1934
- Born: 8 September 1874; Florence, Italy
- Died: 3 October 1971 (aged 97); Lisbon, Portugal
- Education: University of Florence
- Known for: Castellani's paint
- Awards: Honorary Knight Commander of the Order of St Michael and St George
- Scientific career
- Fields: Dermatology, mycology, bacteriology
- Workplaces: Bonn, London, Colombo, Naples, New Orleans, St. Louis, Lisbon
- Academic advisors: Celso Pellizzari (1851–1925)

President of the Accademia nazionale delle scienze
- In office 23 January 1937 – 20 May 1948
- Preceded by: Orso Mario Corbino
- Succeeded by: Francesco Severi

Aldo Luigi Mario Castellani, Marchese di Chisimajo, KCMG (8 September 1874 (Note: The year of birth is also given as 1877 in some sources) – 3 October 1971) was an Italian pathologist and microbiologist. He is best remembered as discoverer of the etiology of sleeping sickness (with David Bruce, 1903) and yaws (1905), and as a pioneer in the development and use of combined vaccines.

== Life and achievements ==
Castellani was born in Florence and educated there, qualifying in medicine in 1899. He worked for a time in Bonn and joined the School of Hygiene and Tropical Medicine in London in 1901. As bacteriologist with the Royal Society Commission on Sleeping Sickness in 1902, he went to Entebbe, Uganda with George Carmichael Low and Cuthbert Christy. He demonstrated the cause and means of transmission of sleeping sickness, discovered the spirochete of yaws, and did other original work in bacteriology and in parasitic diseases of the skin. In 1903 he was appointed Bacteriologist to the Government of Ceylon at the Central laboratory in Colombo and continued research in mycology and bacteriology, describing several new species of intestinal bacilli. He invented the absorption test for the serological identification of closely allied organisms. He left Ceylon in 1915 for Naples where he took the Chair of Medicine. He was involved during World War I in Serbia and Macedonia as a member of the Inter-Allied Sanitary Commission.

In 1919 Castellani went to London as Consultant to the Ministry of Pensions. He became lecturer on mycology and mycotic diseases at the London School of Hygiene and Tropical Medicine (LSHTM), and established a consulting practice in Harley Street. He was also director of tropical medicine and dermatology at the Ross Institute prior to its merger with LSHTM. In late 1925 he arrived in New Orleans to direct a tropical medicine department at Tulane University School of Medicine, and would travel twice yearly between New Orleans and London to work on two continents. He was knighted in 1928 as an Honorary KCMG (Note: His honours were withdrawn in the course of World War II, but later regranted by Queen Elizabeth II) and in 1934 his daughter Jacqueline Castellani married Sir Miles Lampson.

Castellani's enthusiasm for Royal and eminent patients such as Benito Mussolini clouded his reputation and during World War II he supported Italy against the Allies, becoming chief of the Italian Army's medical service. War correspondent Alaric Jacob discovered his looted quarters in Cirene in December 1941 and was tempted to pass his correspondence to his son in law Sir Miles Lampson, then British Ambassador in Egypt.

Castellani was President of the International Society of Dermatology from 1960 to 1964, which he had founded in 1959. He was also professor of tropical medicine at the State University of Louisiana and at the Royal University of Rome. He followed the Queen of Italy Marie José into exile in Portugal and ended his life as Professor at Lisbon's Institute of Tropical Medicine. Castellani died in 1971. Castellani's paint (Carbol fuchsin solution) is still occasionally used to treat fungal skin infections.

The amoeba Acanthamoeba castellanii (Douglas, 1930) was discovered by him and later found to be an opportunistic human pathogen.

== Literary works ==
- Manual of tropical medicine, 1910 (with Albert John Chalmers); 2nd edition, 1913; 3rd edition. 1919.
- Fungi and fungous diseases, 1928
- Climate and acclimatisation, 1938
- Manuale di clinica tropicale, (with Jacono)
- Microbes, Men and Monarchs: A Doctor's Life in Many Lands: The Autobiography of Aldo Castellani Victor Gollancz LTD (1963)

== Bibliography ==
- Anonymous, "Aldo Castellani (Obituary)", The British Medical Journal, 16 October 1971, p. 175
- Binazzi, Maurizio, "Italian Memoirs of Aldo Castellani", International Journal of Dermatology, vol. 30, n. 10 (October 1991), pp. 741–5
- Borghi, Luca. The Globetrotter of Medicine: The life and times of Aldo Castellani (1874-1971), Amazon KDP, 2025, pp. 650, ISBN 979-8325992148
- Borghi, Luca, Riva, Elisabetta, "Was Aldo Castellani the inventor of combined and polyvalent vaccines?", Vaccine, 39 (2021), pp. 5442–5446
- Borghi, Luca, "Man Who Won the War": Myth and Reality of Aldo Castellani's Role in Preserving the Health of Troops During the Italo-Ethiopian War 1935–1936, Adv Exp Med Biol, 2022 Jul 26. Online ahead of print. https://doi.org/10.1007/5584_2022_737
- Bosco, G., "Ricordo di Aldo Castellani", Rivista Italiana d'Igiene, vol. 62 (2003), nn. 1–2, pp. 1–17
- Cambournac, Francisco J.C., "Professor Sir Aldo Castellani", Anais da Escola Nacional de Saude Publica e de Medicina Tropical, vol. 5, nn. 3-4 (Julho-Dezembro 1971), pp. 377–383
- Cipollaro, Vincent A., "Euphoria et cacophoria - anecdotes, reminiscences and controversies of Aldo Castellani; and 'who let Castellani go'?", International Journal of Dermatology, 2007, 46, 439–442
- Cook, Gordon C., "Aldo Castellani FRCP (1877-1971) and the founding of the Ross Institute & Hospital for Tropical Diseases at Putney", J Med Biog 2000: 8, 198–205
- Garnham, Percy Cyril C., "Aldo Castellani 1877-1971", Commentarii Pontificia Academia Scientiarum, vol. 2 (1972), n. 45, pp. 1–35
- Ito, Kasuke, "A Synopsis of the Life of Aldo Castellani", International Journal of Dermatology, vol. 11, n. 4 (oct-dec 1972), pp. 192–6
- Parish, Lawrence Charles, "Reflections on Aldo Castellani and Tropical Dermatology", Trans R Soc Trop Med Hyg, 2018 Apr 1;112(4):155-157
- Raffaele, Giulio, Aldo Castellani. Discorso commemorativo pronunciato dal Linceo Giulio Raffaele nella Seduta ordinaria del 14 aprile 1973, Accademia Nazionale dei Lincei, Roma 1973, pp. 17
- Rho, Filippo, "Glorie e figure della Medicina Italiana: Aldo Castellani", Estratto da La Medicina Italiana (n. 7, luglio 1922), pp. 8
- Sebastiani, Antonio, Serarcangeli, Carla, "Aldo Castellani (1874-1971). Un viaggio scientifico lungo un secolo", Medicina nei Secoli, 2003;15(3):469-500
- Seeliger, H.P.R., Seefried, L., "Aldo Castellani - an Appraisal of his Life and Oeuvre", Mycoses, 15 May 1989, 32(8), pp. 391–397
- Vanbreuseghem, Raymond, "Notice sur la vie et l'oeuvre du Professeur Aldo Castellani, Membre honoraire étranger (8 septembre 1874 – 3 octobre 1971)", Bull. Acad. Mèd. Belg., 128 (1973), pp. 69–78
- W.F.D.-C., "Aldo Castellani (Obituary)", The Lancet, 16 October 1971, p. 883
