= Atopochilus christyi =

Conservation status
- Least Concern (IUCN 3.1)

Scientific classification
- Kingdom: Animalia
- Phylum: Chordata
- Class: Actinopterygii
- Order: Siluriformes
- Family: Mochokidae
- Genus: Atopochilus
- Species: A. christyi

Binomial name
- Atopochilus christyi Boulenger,1920

Species of fish

Atopochilus christyi is a species of upside-down catfish endemic to the Democratic Republic of the Congo. It occurs in the Ituri, Itimbri, and Kasai Rivers, as well as the Kinsuka Rapids and Boyoma Falls. This species grows to a standard length of 9.5 cm (3.7 in).

== Etymology ==
The catfish is named in honor of Cuthbert Christy (1863-1932), a physician (specializing in sleeping sickness), a zoologist, an explorer, and the director of the Congo Museum in Tervuren, Belgium, who collected the type specimen.
