= Greenwoodochromis christyi =

Conservation status
- Least Concern (IUCN 3.1)

Scientific classification
- Kingdom: Animalia
- Phylum: Chordata
- Class: Actinopterygii
- Order: Cichliformes
- Family: Cichlidae
- Genus: Greenwoodochromis
- Species: G. christyi

Binomial name
- Greenwoodochromis christyi (Trewavas, 1953)

Species of fish

Greenwoodochromis christyi is a species of fish in the family Cichlidae. It is endemic to the deeper water of southern Lake Tanganyika.

== Etymology ==
The specific name of this fish honours the explorer and naturalist Cuthbert Christy (1863–1932).
