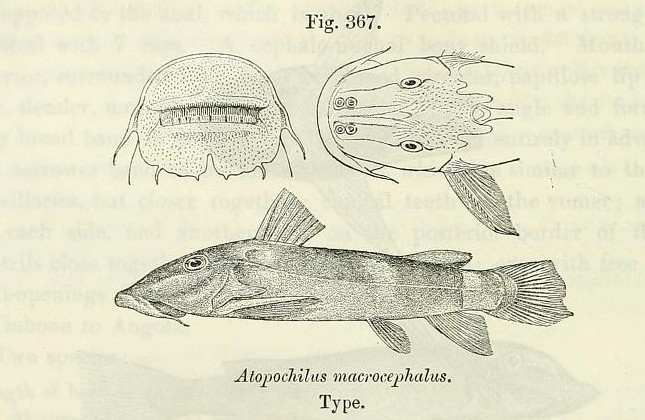

Conservation status
- Data Deficient (IUCN 3.1)

Scientific classification
- Kingdom: Animalia
- Phylum: Chordata
- Class: Actinopterygii
- Order: Siluriformes
- Family: Mochokidae
- Genus: Atopochilus
- Species: A. macrocephalus

Binomial name
- Atopochilus macrocephalus Boulenger, 1906

= Atopochilus macrocephalus =

Species of fish

Atopochilus macrocephalus is a species of upside-down catfish endemic to Angola where it occurs in the Kwango River in the vicinity of Fort Don Carlos. This species grows to a length of 7.5 centimetres (3.0 in) SL. It is consumed for food and is threatened by human activities with very extensive diamond mining being the most significant threat.
