= Greenwoodochromis bellcrossi =

Conservation status
- Least Concern (IUCN 3.1)

Scientific classification
- Kingdom: Animalia
- Phylum: Chordata
- Class: Actinopterygii
- Order: Cichliformes
- Family: Cichlidae
- Genus: Greenwoodochromis
- Species: G. bellcrossi

Binomial name
- Greenwoodochromis bellcrossi (Poll, 1976)

Synonyms
- Hemibates bellcrossi Poll, 1976; Lepidochromis bellcrossi (Poll, 1976); Limnochromis bellcrossi (Poll, 1976)

Species of fish

Greenwoodochromis bellcrossi is a species of fish in the family Cichlidae. is endemic to the deep waters of Lake Tanganyika, East Africa.

== Etymology ==
The specific name of this fish honours the South African ichthyologist Graham Bell-Cross (1927–1998) who was deputy executive director of the National Museums and Monuments of Rhodesia.
