= Atopochilus chabanaudi =

Conservation status
- Data Deficient (IUCN 3.1)

Scientific classification
- Domain: Eukaryota
- Kingdom: Animalia
- Phylum: Chordata
- Class: Actinopterygii
- Order: Siluriformes
- Family: Mochokidae
- Genus: Atopochilus
- Species: A. chabanaudi

Binomial name
- Atopochilus chabanaudi Pellegrin, 1938

Species of fish

Atopochilus chabanaudi is a species of upside-down catfish endemic to the Republic of the Congo where it occurs in Stanley Pool. It is consumed for food and is threatened by urbanisation of Stanley Pool, water pollution and lead toxicity which comes from car oil and boat traffic. This species grows to a length of 6.0 centimetres (2.4 in) SL.

== Etymology ==
The catfish is named in honor of ichthyologist-herpetologist Paul Chabanaud (1876-1959), who was Preparator of Fishes, at the Muséum national d’Histoire naturelle in Paris.
