= Jacono =

Jacono is a surname. Notable people with the surname include:

- Andrew A. Jacono (born 1970), American plastic surgeon
- Giovanni Jacono (1873−1957), Italian Roman Catholic prelate
- Nestor Jacono (1925-2014), Maltese athlete

== See also ==
- Lojacono
