= Lojacono =

- Pronunciation: pronounced [loˈjaːkono]

Origin
- Meaning: deacon.
- Region of origin: Puglia; Sicilia

Other names
- Variant forms: Loiacono (Pugliese), Lo Jacono (Siciliano), Jacono

Lojacono is a family name of Italian origin. It may refer to:

- Alvaro Lojacono, Italian terrorist
- Corrado Lojacono, Italian singer
- Francesco Lojacono, Italian painter
- Francisco Lojacono, Italian Argentine footballer
- Matilde Lojacono, birth name of Italian actress Matilde Gioli

== See also ==
- Jacono
