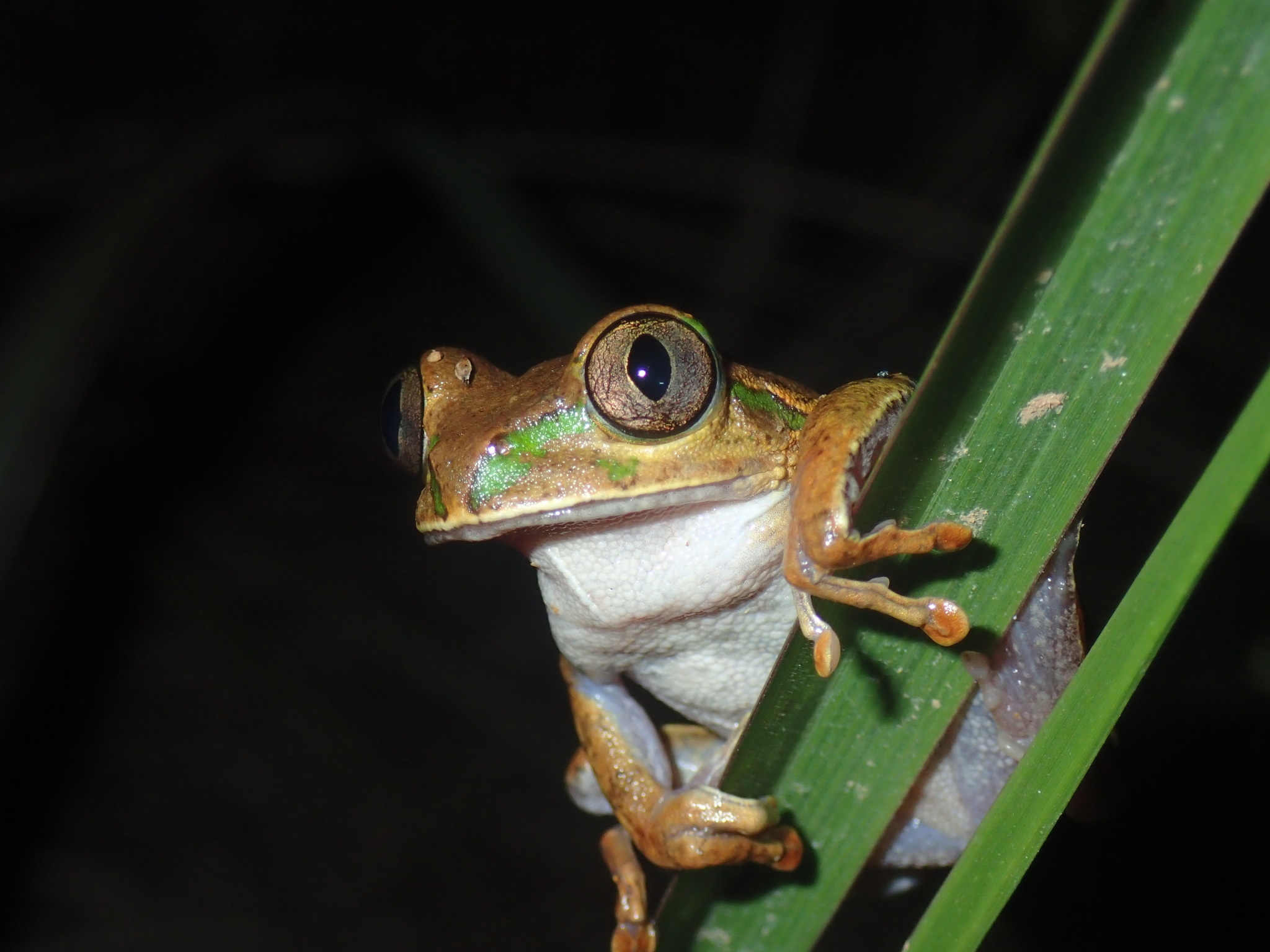

Conservation status
- Least Concern (IUCN 3.1)

Scientific classification
- Kingdom: Animalia
- Phylum: Chordata
- Class: Amphibia
- Order: Anura
- Family: Arthroleptidae
- Genus: Leptopelis
- Species: L. christyi

Binomial name
- Leptopelis christyi (Boulenger, 1912)

Synonyms
- Hylambates christyi Boulenger, 1912; Leptopelis budduensis Ahl, 1929; Leptopelis notatus christyi — Loveridge, 1942

= Leptopelis christyi =

Species of amphibian

Leptopelis christyi, also known as the Christy's tree frog or Christy's forest treefrog, is a species of frog in the family Arthroleptidae. It is known with confidence from eastern and northeastern Democratic Republic of Congo, southern and western Uganda, and northwestern Tanzania. It is likely to occur in Burundi and Rwanda, possibly ranging further in East Africa. There is an isolated population in Cameroon and Gabon that might represent a distinct species.

== Etymology ==
The specific name christyi honours Dr. Cuthbert Christy, a British army doctor who collected the holotype.

== Description ==
Adult males measure 36–41 mm (1.4–1.6 in) and adult females 55–62 mm (2.2–2.4 in) in snout–vent length. The tympanum is large, about half to three-fourths of the diameter of the eye. The dorsum often bears a dark, forward-pointing triangle. Most individuals have a light, irregular lateral line. Also a green colour phase might be present. Males have pectoral glands. The male advertisement call is a single, rather tonal clack.

== Habitat and conservation ==
Leptopelis christyi occurs in lowland, montane and gallery forests, as well as in more open habitats such as savanna woodland at elevations of 1,000–2,100 m (3,300–6,900 ft) above sea level, possibly higher. It occurs also in degraded forest habitats. It is an arboreal species, but the eggs are deposited on the ground; flooding washes the tadpoles in water.

L. christyi is a common and adaptable species that is not exposed to any significant threats. It is found in Kibale National Park (Uganda), Virunga National Park (Democratic Republic of Congo), and Garamba National Park (Democratic Republic of Congo), and probably occurs in many other protected areas.
