= Andrew A. Jacono =

American plastic surgeon

Dr. Andrew A. Jacono
- Born: Andrew A. Jacono; United States of America
- Education: Muhlenberg College; Albert Einstein College of Medicine
- Occupation: Plastic surgeon
- Years active: 1996–present
- Children: 4

Andrew A. Jacono is an American facial surgeon and creator of the minimal access deep-plane extended facelift, a minimally invasive hybrid facelift. Jacono starred in the Discovery Fit & Health television program Facing Trauma as the volunteer surgeon who reconstructed faces disfigured in abusive relationships and other violent circumstances.

He is the founder of the New York Center for Facial Plastic & Laser Surgery, and the author of The Park Avenue Face.

== Education ==
After completing his undergraduate studies in chemistry at Muhlenberg College in Allentown, Pennsylvania, Jacono earned his medical degree from the Albert Einstein College of Medicine in New York. He completed an internship in general surgery at St. Vincent's Hospital and Medical Center, after which he completed his surgical residency in head and neck surgery at the New York Eye and Ear Infirmary. Jacono then continued further training with a fellowship in aesthetic facial plastic and reconstructive surgery at the University of Rochester.

He is dual board certified in facial plastic and reconstructive surgery and in otolaryngology/head and neck surgery and is a Fellow of the American College of Surgeons.

== Career ==
Dr. Jacono is an associate clinical professor, Division of Facial Plastic & Reconstructive Surgery at Albert Einstein College of Medicine. He serves as the section head of facial plastic & reconstructive surgery at North Shore University Hospital at Manhasset. Additionally, Jacono serves as director of the New York Center for Facial Plastic & Laser Surgery and fellowship director of the American Academy of Facial Plastic and Reconstructive Surgery.

== Surgical procedure contributions ==
Jacono has published multiple medical articles in peer-reviewed journals. In 2012, Jacono was part of a surgical mission team in Thailand. Surgeries included the repair of cleft lip deformities, cleft palate deformities, and rhinoplasty procedures.

Jacono published a Midline Corset Platysmaplasty Cadaveric Study in 2016. The research showed that adding a midline corset platysmaplasty significantly reduced the amount of skin lift achieved in deep plane rhytidectomy.

In 2018, Jacono published Extended Deep Plane Facelift: Incorporating Facial Retaining Ligament Release and Composite Flap Shifts to Maximize Midface, Jawline and Neck Rejuvenation. The research described an extended deep plane facelift that systematically releases key retaining ligaments to enhance mobilization of deep soft tissues.

Jacono published his work on the MADE facelift, a surgical procedure that combines the features of a deep plane facelift with those of the short-scar minimal access cranial suspension lift. His research was published in the Aesthetic Surgery Journal in November 2019 in his paper "A Novel Extended Deep Plane Facelift Technique for Jawline Rejuvenation and Volumization."

Jacono published Transcutaneous Blepharoplasty with Volume Preservation: Indications, Advantages, Technique, Contraindications, and Alternatives in 2021. Also in 2021, he published The Art and Science of Extended Deep Plane Facelifting and Complementary Facial Rejuvenation Procedures.

== Personal ==
Jacono has four children from two previous relationships.
