= Cuthbert Christy =

English doctor and zoologist

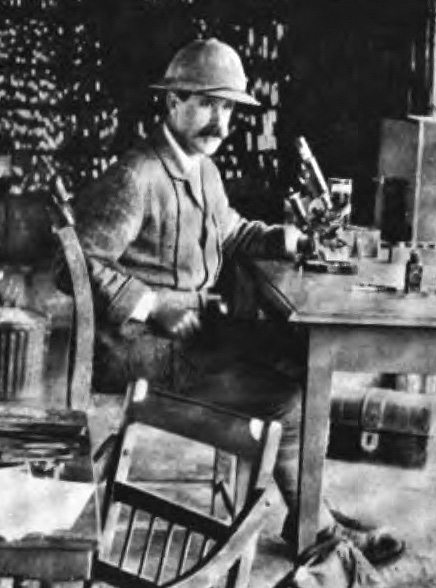
- Christy in Uganda in 1902
- Born: 1863; Chelmsford, Essex, England
- Died: 29 May 1932 (aged 68–69); Aka River region, Belgian Congo
- Occupations: Medical practitioner, explorer
- Known for: Christy commission report on slavery in Liberia

Cuthbert Christy (1863 – 29 May 1932) was an English medical doctor and zoologist who undertook extensive explorations of Central Africa during the first part of the 20th century. He was known for his work on sleeping sickness, and for the Christy Report on slavery in Liberia in the 1920s.

== Early years ==
Cuthbert Christy was born in 1863, son of Robert Christy of Chelmsford. His younger sister, Eva Christy, was a riding instructor and writer. He was educated at Olivers Mount School, in Scarborough, North Yorkshire, then won a Mackenzie bursary to the University of Edinburgh. He graduated in 1892. He travelled widely in South America and the West Indies between 1892 and 1895. He was senior medical officer to the second battalion, West African Field Force in Northern Nigeria from 1898 to 1900. He was then appointed special medical officer for plague duty in Bombay, working in the Plague Laboratory in that city.

== African travels ==
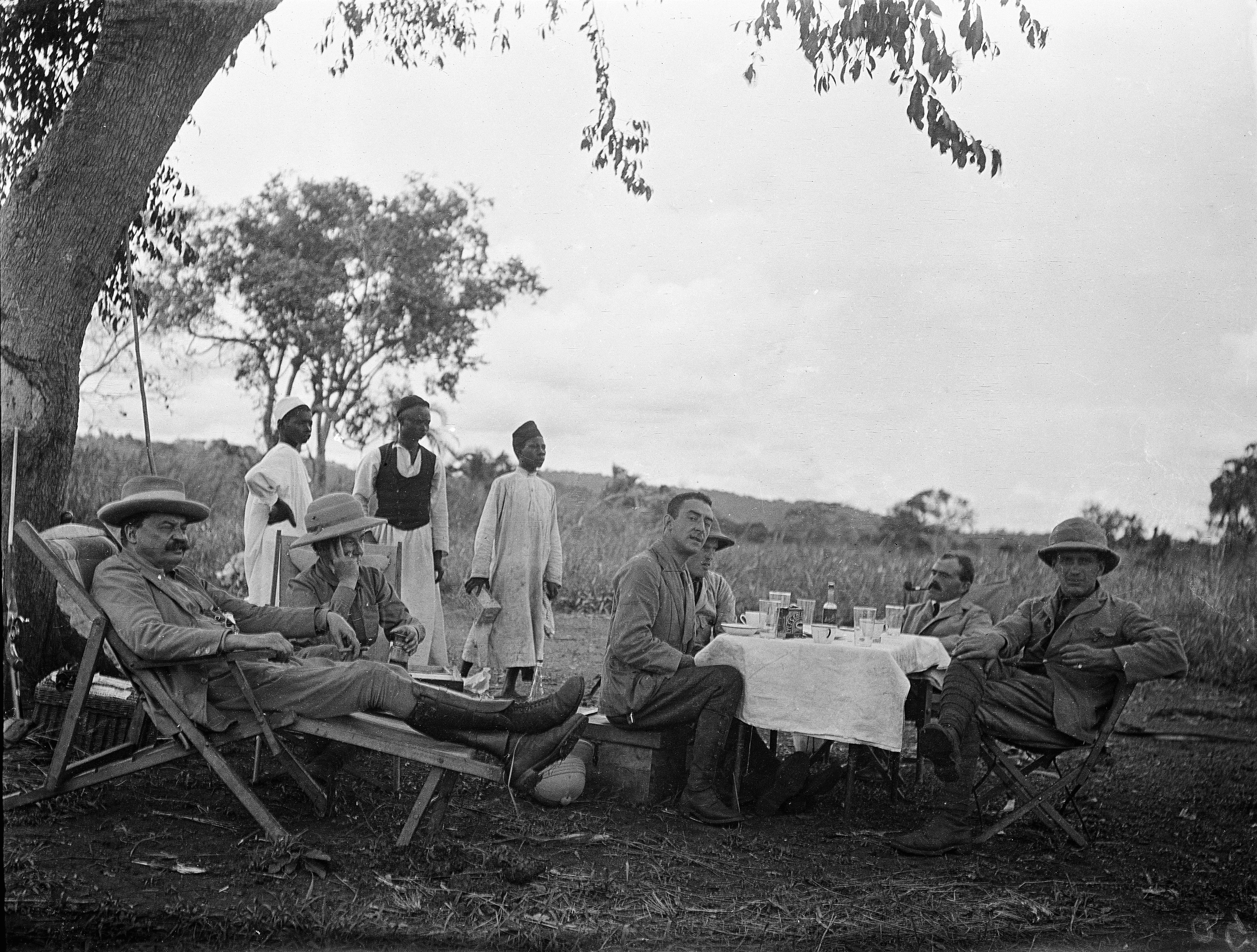
Cuthbert Christy and others on a Sleeping Sickness Commission field study.

Christy became a highly skilled naturalist. In 1902 he was chosen as a member of a three-man British government commission to investigate trypanosomiasis (sleeping sickness) in Uganda. The other two were George Carmichael Low and Aldo Castellani. An epidemic of the disease was raging in Uganda, and almost 14,000 people had died by the spring of 1902. The three-man reached Kisumu in July 1902. Christie undertook a survey to create a map showing where the disease was found, travelling from place to place, taking blood samples, recording symptoms and trapping mosquitoes.

Christy was a member of a team sponsored by the Liverpool School of Tropical Medicine that arrived in the Congo Free State on 23 September 1903 to assess public health, and sleeping sickness in particular. His companions were Joseph Everett Dutton and John Lancelot Todd, and they were joined in the Congo by Inge-Valdemar Heiberg. The team spent nine months in the Lower Congo, then on 30 June 1904 began investigating upstream as far as Kasongo.

They returned to Boma on 27 February 1905. The emphasis was on the health of Europeans. Despite covering a large area, the expedition did not investigate the huge tracts where few or no Europeans were present. Christy worked in Ceylon in 1906, in Uganda and East Africa from 1906 to 1909, and then in Nigeria, the Gold Coast and the Cameroons from 1909 to 1910. In 1911 he published The African rubber industry and Funtumia elastica ("kickxia").

Between 1911 and 1914 Christy worked for the Belgian government in the Belgian Congo, mostly studying sleeping sickness. For more than a year he explored the forests to the west of Mbeni and the Rwenzori Mountains. During World War I (1914–1918), between 1915 and 1916 he worked for the Sudan government in mapping the Congo-Nile Divide, which divided the Congo from the Sudan.

In part to reduce the spread of disease, the colonial authorities had imposed increasing travel restrictions on the local people. Christy observed that far more passports for cross-border travel were being issued by the Congolese authorities than by the Sudanese. He said that the main pretext was to hunt for a runaway woman, but the main reason was to trade in rubber. In 1916 Christy was appointed Advisor for Malaria to the East African Expeditionary Force. He was in charge of the military hospital in Dar es Salaam, and then in Mesopotamia.

Between 1920 and 1923 Christy explored the Bahr el Ghazal in what is now South Sudan. From 1925 to 1928 he was leader of an expedition arranged by the Natural History Museum to explore the Tanganyika lakes. Christy was employed in French Equatorial Africa and French West Africa from 1928 to 1929.

== Christy commission ==
In 1929 an American missionary in Liberia reported that Liberian officials were using soldiers to gather tribal people who were shipped to the island of Fernando Po as forced labourers. The Liberian government denied the charges and invited a League of Nations commission of inquiry. Cuthbert Christy headed the commission. Charles S. Johnson, a black American, was the United States representative. The former President Arthur Barclay represented Liberia.

The commission began work on 8 April 1930. While Arthur Barclay remained in Monrovia for reasons of health, after six weeks Christy and Johnston left the capital and travelled first together, then separately, into the interior where they took testimony. They returned in July and conducted further interviews. Altogether the commission members heard 264 people including politicians, officials, chiefs and ordinary people.

The result of the inquiries was a report submitted in September 1930. It found that the labourers had been recruited "under condition of criminal compulsion scarcely distinguishable from slave raiding and slave trading." "Forced or compulsory labour" had been used by the government of Liberia for purposes such as road and public utility construction, and "...in certain cases, labour recruited...for public purposes has been diverted to private use on the farms and plantations of high Government officials and private citizens."

The commission also found that as recently as 1928, Liberian Government officials and Frontier Force soldiers had been "...raiding and forcibly recruiting native boys for shipment to the island of Fernando Po (Bioko)". Landowners from the island had needed manual laborers and arranged to pay Liberian "recruiting agents", including the President's brother, for the shipment of 3000 boys." As a result of the Christy report, President Charles D. B. King and Vice-president Allen N. Yancy both resigned.

Christie and Johnson disagreed in their interpretation of the findings, with Johnson saying that "His [Christy's] ... hysterical, extreme statements in summary fashion [condemned] the whole government and [called] everything slavery, slave dealing, slave traffic, etc." At root was a disagreement over whether the abuses could be remedied under black self-rule, with Christy eventually coming round to Johnson's view that the country should remain independent. Although much of the work was done by the other team members, some felt that it was important to Christy to take most of the credit. Some authors feel that Christy was generally negative towards the role of the United States in Liberia, and interested in showing that the Firestone Tire and Rubber Company was complicit in slaving.

== Death and legacy ==
Charles S. Johnson said soon after meeting him in 1930 that although he was 66 he "looks and has the heartiness of a man of 45." Christy was extremely vain and was described as "a most difficult and irascible man."

In 1932 Christy was in the Aka River region of the Belgian Congo. He was conducting zoological investigation for the Belgian government, and was in search of elephants. He fired at a male buffalo. The wounded animal charged and gored him, and he later died of his wounds on 29 May 1932.

== Taxa named in his honour ==
- Naja christyi, commonly known as the Congo water cobra or Christy's water cobra
- Chamaelycus christyi (Christy's banded snake), in the Chamaelycus genus
- Polemon christyi (Christy's snake-eater).
- Graphiurus christyi, a dormouse
- Atopochilus christyi, a species of upside-down catfish endemic to the Democratic Republic of the Congo. It occurs in the Ituri, Itimbri and Kasai Rivers as well as the Kinsuka Rapids and Boyoma Falls.
- Neolamprologus christyi, a species of cichlid endemic to Lake Tanganyika.
- Aristochromis christyi, Trewavas, 1935 a species of fish in the family Cichlidae that is endemic to Lake Malawi in Africa. Christy was the collector of the type specimen.
- Lethrinops christyi, a species of cichlid endemic to Lake Malawi where it is only known from the southern part of the lake. Christy was the collector of the type specimen.
- Greenwoodochromis christyi is a species of fish in the family Cichlidae. It is endemic to the deeper water of southern Lake Tanganyika.
- Leptopelis christyi, also known as the Christy's tree frog or Christy's forest treefrog, a species of frog in the family Arthroleptidae. It is known with confidence from eastern and northeastern Democratic Republic of Congo, southern and western Uganda, and northwestern Tanzania.
- The Lindi mormyrid, Petrocephalus christyi, a species of electric fish in the family Mormyridae, found in Africa, being widespread in the Congo River basin, from the rapids just below Pool Malebo to the upper Lualaba, in Central African Republic, Republic of Congo, Democratic Republic of the Congo and Angola.
- The coppernose barb Raiamas christyi, a species of cyprinid fish in the genus Raiamas found in the Congo River system in Africa.

== Bibliography ==
- Christy, Cuthbert (1900). Mosquitoes and malaria: a summary of knowledge on the subject up to date; with an account of the natural history of some mosquitoes. Sampson Law, Marston & Co., Ltd.
- Christy, Cuthbert; Castellani, Aldo; Low, G.C. (1903). The distribution of sleeping sickness. Harrison.
- Christy, Cuthbert; Theobald, Frederick V. (1903). The epidemiology and etiology of sleeping sickness in Equatoriae East Africa. Harrison.
- Dutton, Joseph Everett; Todd, John Lancelot; Christy, Cuthbert; Thomas, Harold Wolferstan; Austen, Ernest Edward (1904). Reports of the Trypanosomiasis Expedition to the Congo 1903–1904 of the Liverpool School of Tropical Medicine and Medical Parasitology. Williams & Norgate for the University Press of Liverpool.
- Christy, Cuthbert (1911). The African rubber industry and Funtumia elastica ("kickxia"). J. Bale, Sons & Danielson, Limited.
- Christy, Cuthbert (1917). Notes on Malaria for The Guidance of Officers and Men. Cape Times.
- Christy, Cuthbert (1917). The Nile-Congo Watershed. William Clowes and Sons.
- Christy, Cuthbert (1924). Big Game and Pygmies: Experiences of a Naturalist in Central African Forests in Quest of the Okapi. Macmillan and Company, Limited.
- Stephenson, John; Christy, Cuthbert (1928). Cuthbert Christy Expedition, 1926.
- Christy, Cuthbert (1931). Report of the International commission of inquiry into the existence of slavery and forced labor in the republic of Liberia. Monrovia, Liberia, September 8, 1930. US Govt. print. off.
- Christy, Cuthbert (1945). Notes on the Prevention of Malaria. Ross Institute of Tropical Hygiene, London School of Hygiene & Tropical Medicine.
- Tredre, R. Ford; Christy, Cuthbert (1966). Notes on the Preservation of Personal Health in Warm Climates. Ross Institute of Tropical Hygiene.
