= George Carmichael Low =

Scottish parasitologist

George Carmichael Low (14 October 1872 – 31 July 1952) was a Scottish parasitologist.

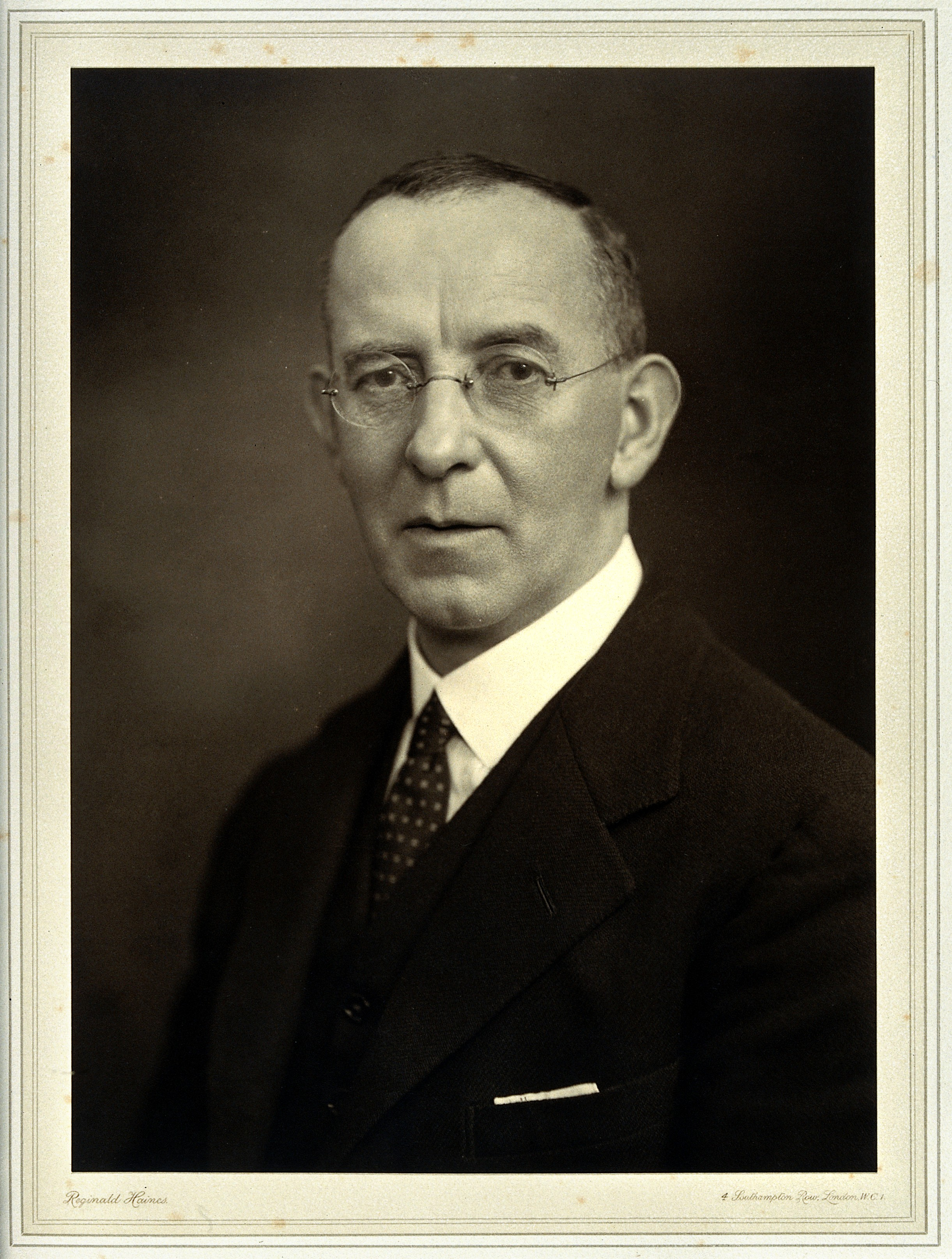
Portrait. Credit: Wellcome Collection

== Biography ==
He was born in Monifieth, Forfarshire, Scotland, the son of Samuel Miller Low, a manufacturer of flax machinery, and educated at Madras College and the University of St Andrews. Having graduated MA from the University, he then studied for a medical degree at the University of Edinburgh graduating MB, CM in 1897. For the next two years he was a resident house doctor at Edinburgh Royal Infirmary.

In November 1899 he moved to London to work at the new London School of Hygiene & Tropical Medicine under Patrick Manson. He was sent to Vienna to learn a new technique for sectioning mosquitos and on his return was able to use the technique to prove that mosquitos pass on parasites from person to person during the act of biting.

In 1900 he spent three months in a malaria-ridden part of Italy and by avoiding mosquitos demonstrated that they were responsible for the transmission of the disease. He spent 1901 in the West Indies, confirming Manson's discovery that filaria (a small worm) transmitted by mosquitos was the cause of elephantiasis. In 1903 he was head of a team sent to Uganda to investigate the cause of "sleeping sickness", which failed to identify the true cause (Trypanasoma sp.) of the outbreak. His companions were Cuthbert Christy and Aldo Castellani.

On his return in 1903 he was appointed superintendent of the Albert Dock Seamen's Hospital (ADH) where the London School of Hygiene & Tropical Medicine was located. He remained there for the rest of his working life, being appointed Physician in 1918 and Senior Physician in 1919. In 1910, Low had obtained his MD from the University of Edinburgh for his thesis on human filariasis. During World War I he was made a Major in the Indian Medical Service, treating sick officers at the ADH.

In 1907 he formed, together with James Cantlie, the Society of Tropical Medicine and Hygiene which in 1920 was granted the Royal prefix to become the Royal Society of Tropical Medicine and Hygiene. He was the 12th president of the Society from 1929 to 1933, and oversaw its move into Manson House in Portland Place where it remained until 2003.

He was a keen ornithologist and served on the council of the Royal Society for the Protection of Birds. He married Edith Nash in 1906; they had no children.
