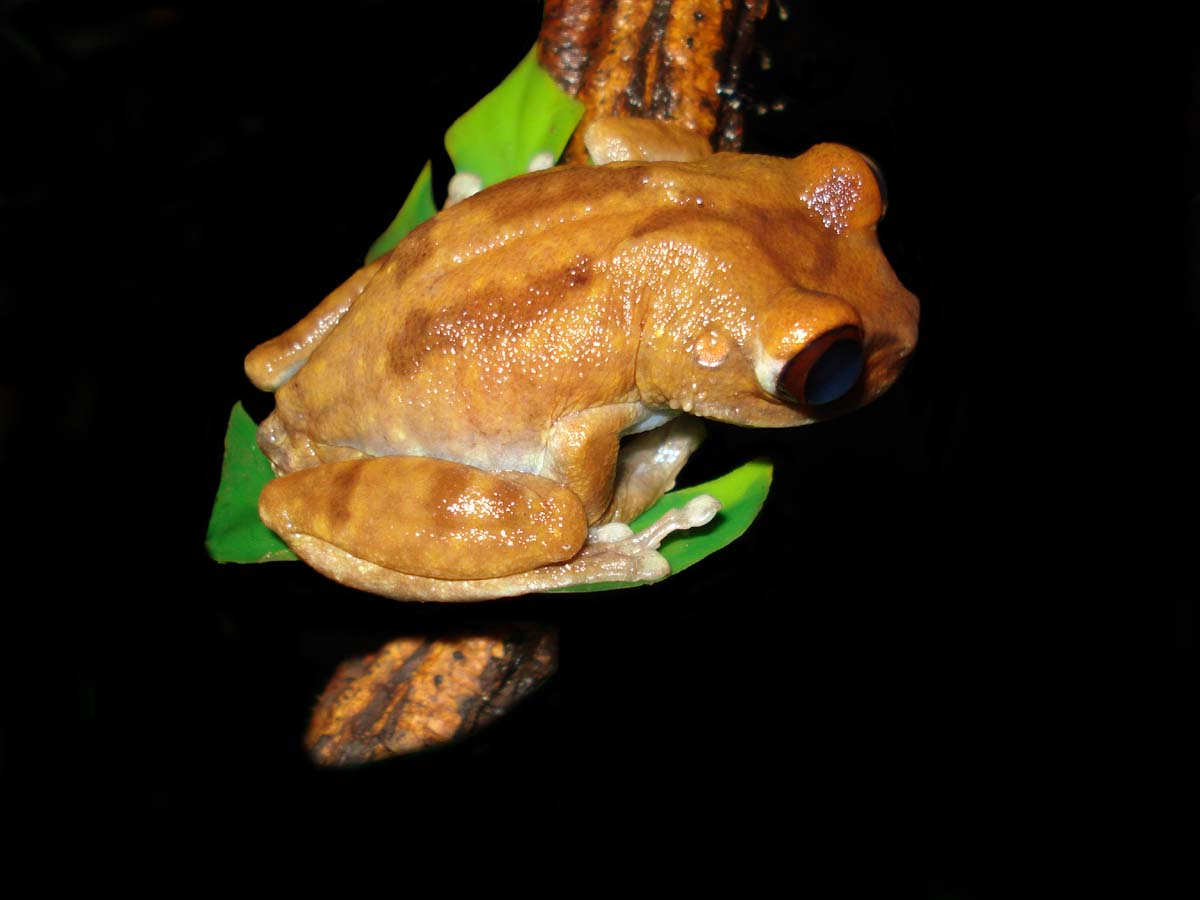
- female

Conservation status
- Near Threatened (IUCN 3.1)

Scientific classification
- Kingdom: Animalia
- Phylum: Chordata
- Class: Amphibia
- Order: Anura
- Family: Arthroleptidae
- Genus: Leptopelis
- Species: L. uluguruensis

Binomial name
- Leptopelis uluguruensis Barbour & Loveridge, 1928

= Uluguru forest tree frog =

Species of amphibian

The Uluguru forest tree frog or ruby-eyed tree frog (Leptopelis uluguruensis) is a species of frog in the family Arthroleptidae endemic to Tanzania. Its natural habitats are subtropical or tropical moist lowland forest, subtropical or tropical moist montane forest, rivers, and intermittent freshwater marshes. It is threatened by habitat loss.

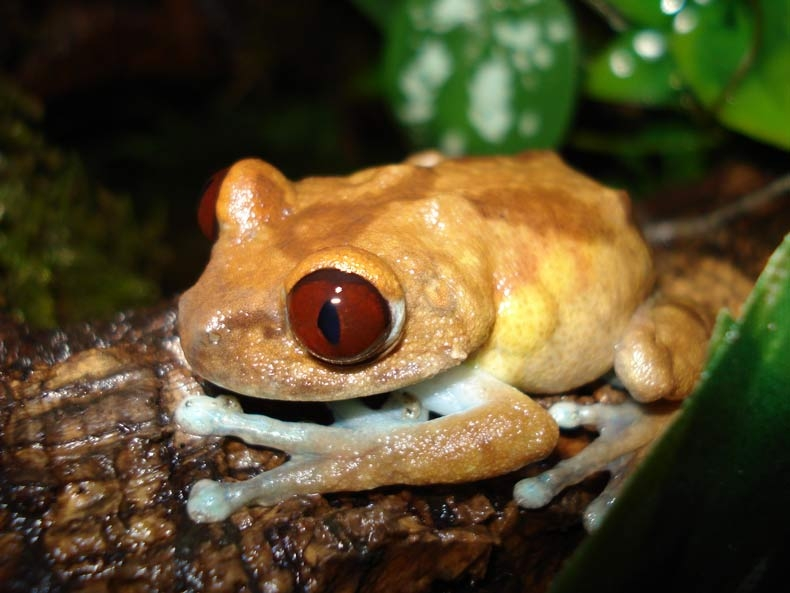
Pregnant female
