= Sport in Cameroon =

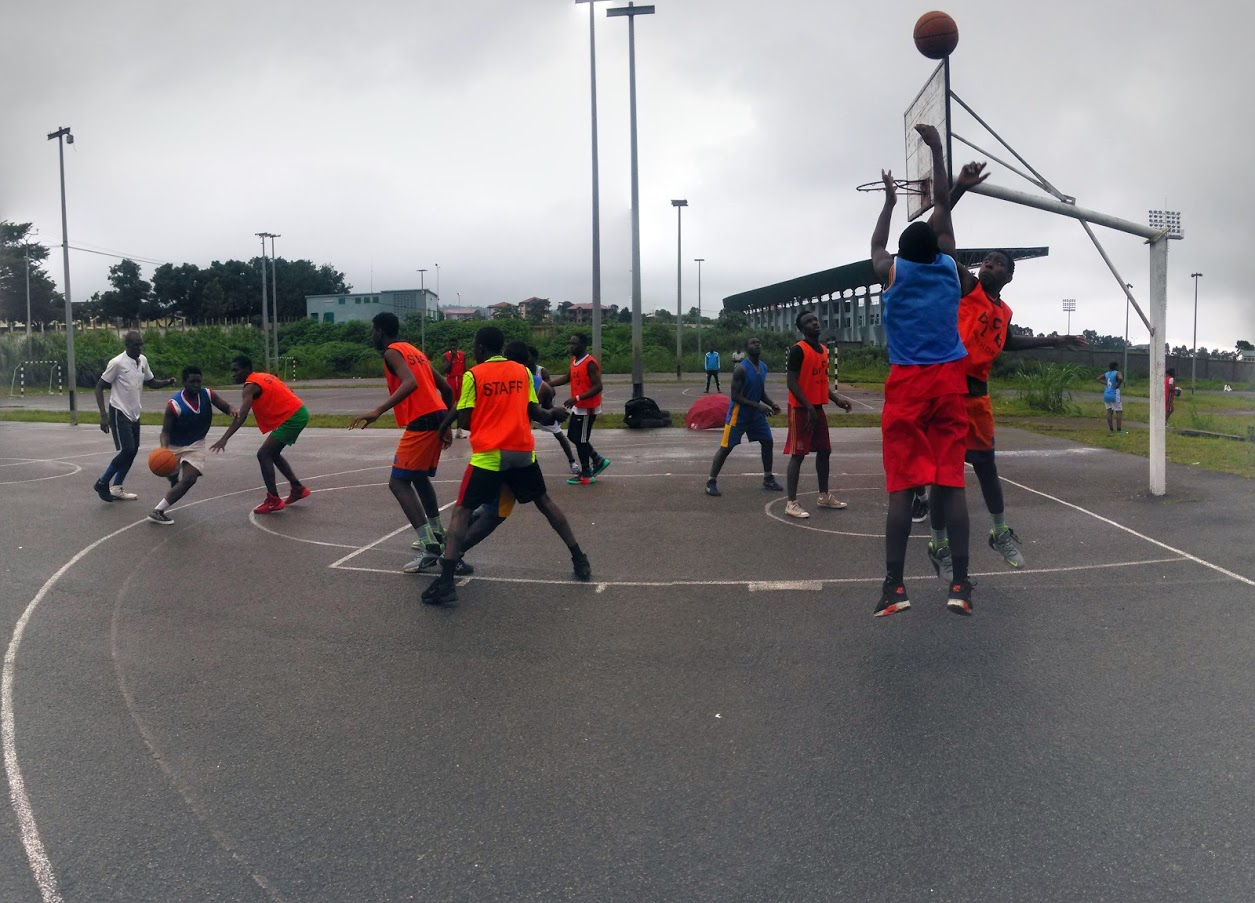
Youths playing basketball at the Molyko Omnisport stadium, Buea

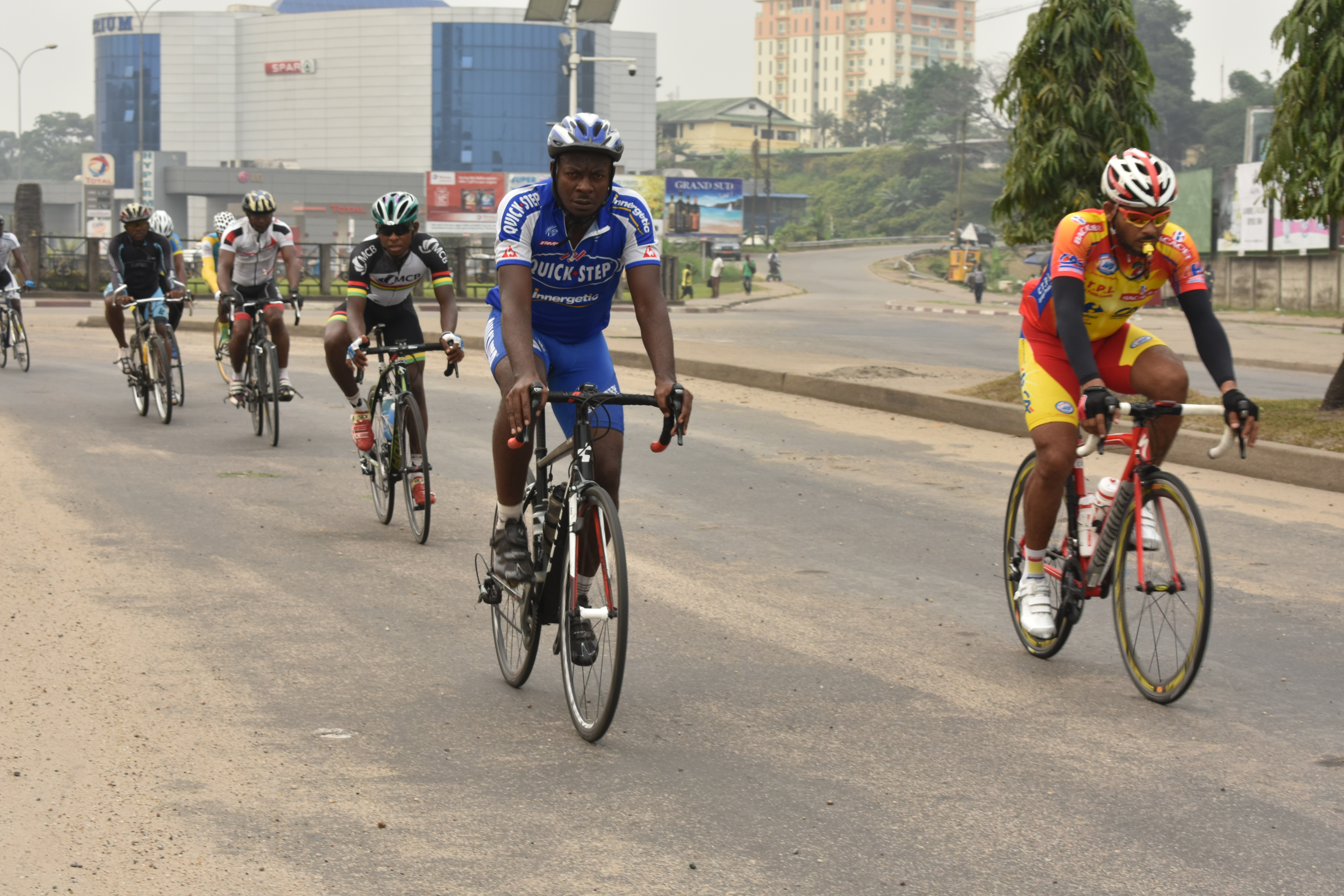
Cycling tour, Cameroon

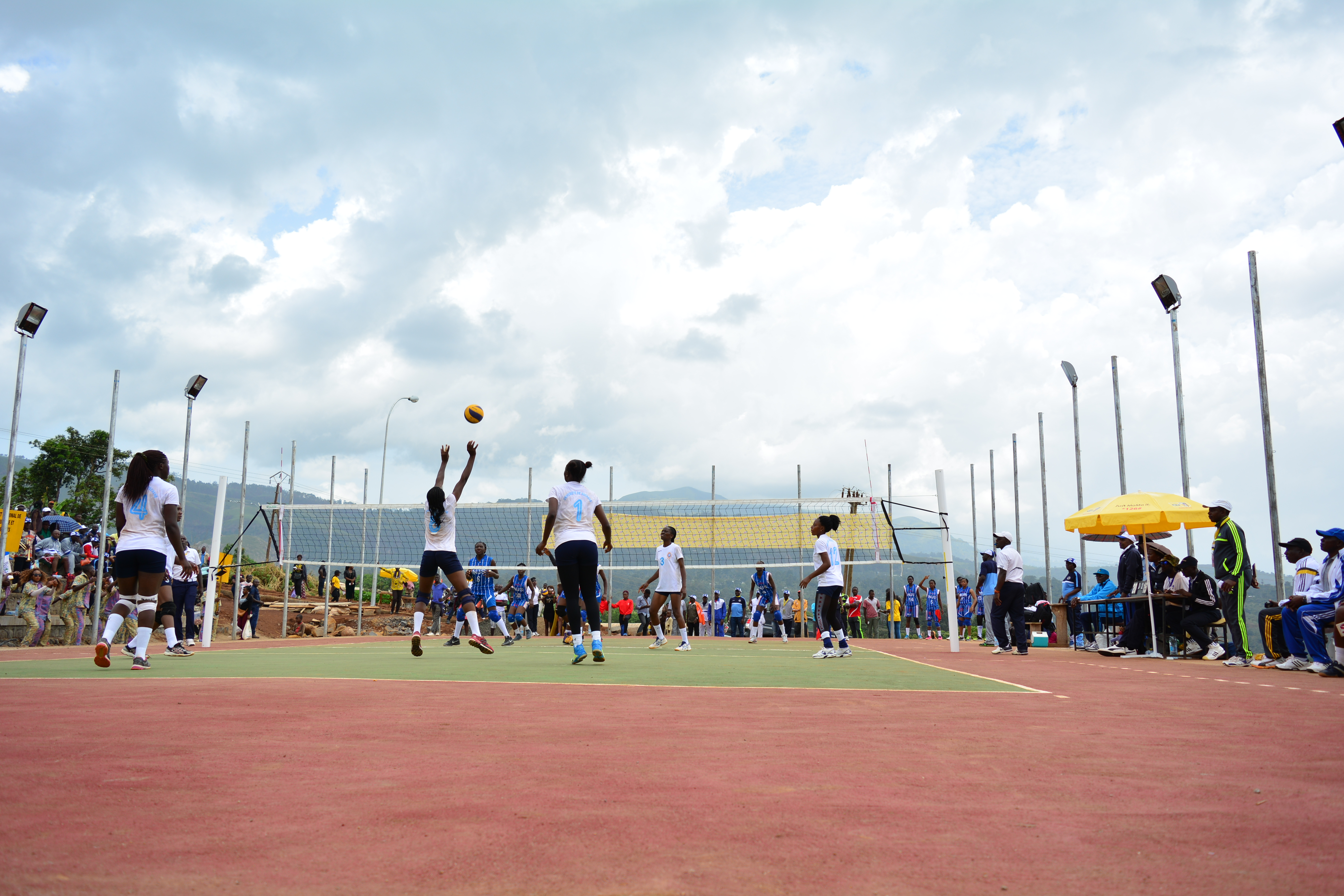
Women playing Volleyball in Cameroon

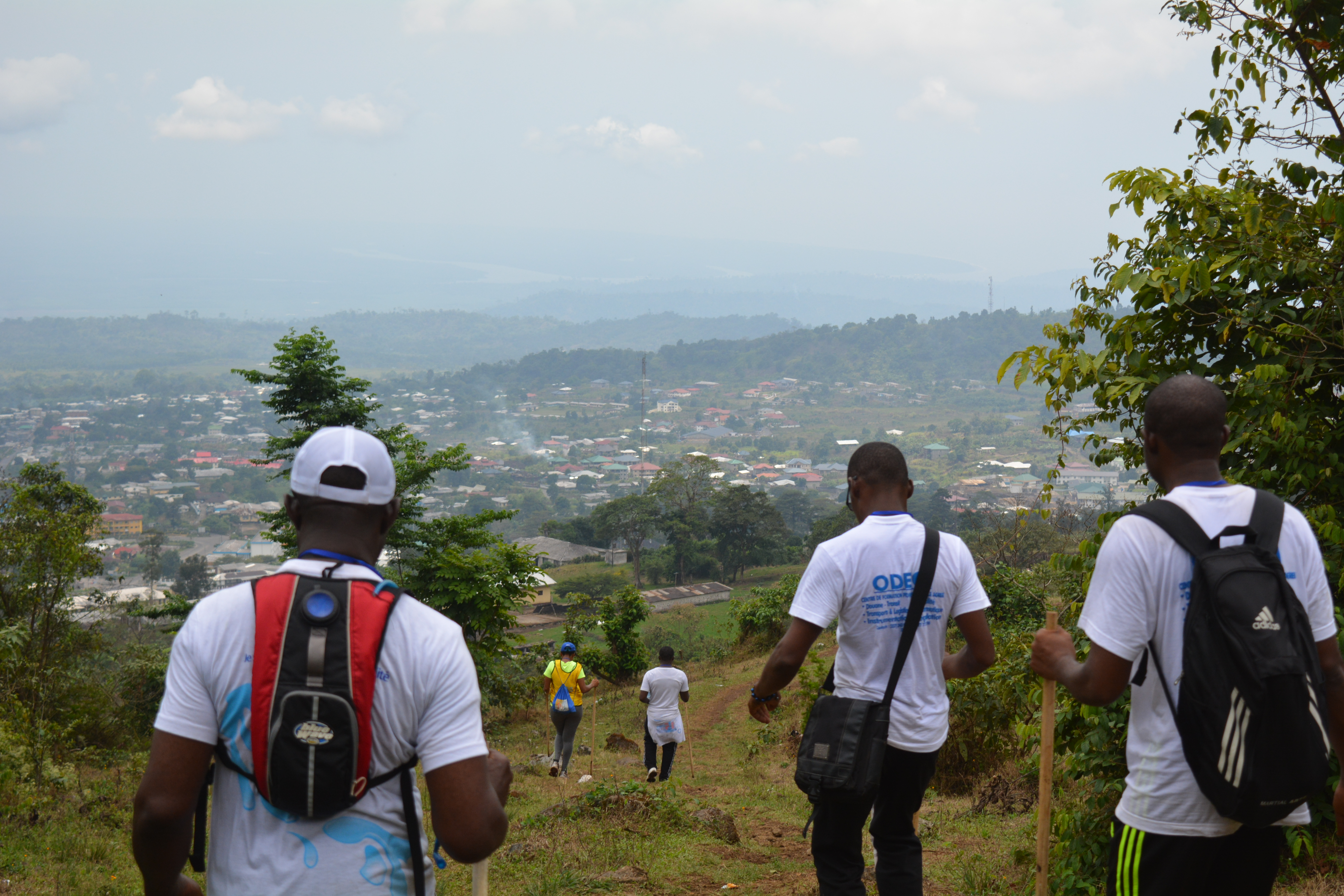
Athletes at Mount Cameroon

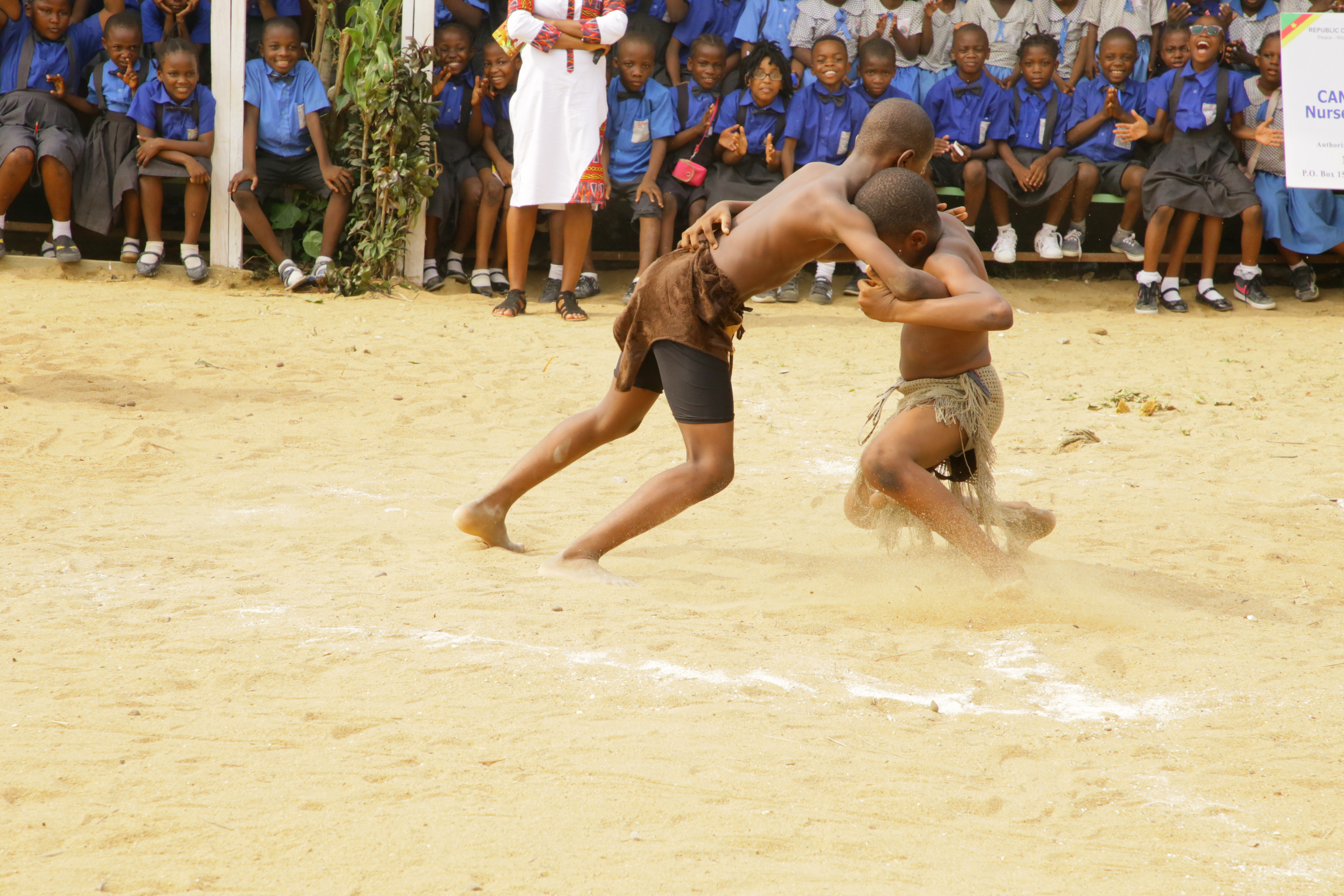
School children in a wrestling competition in Cameroon

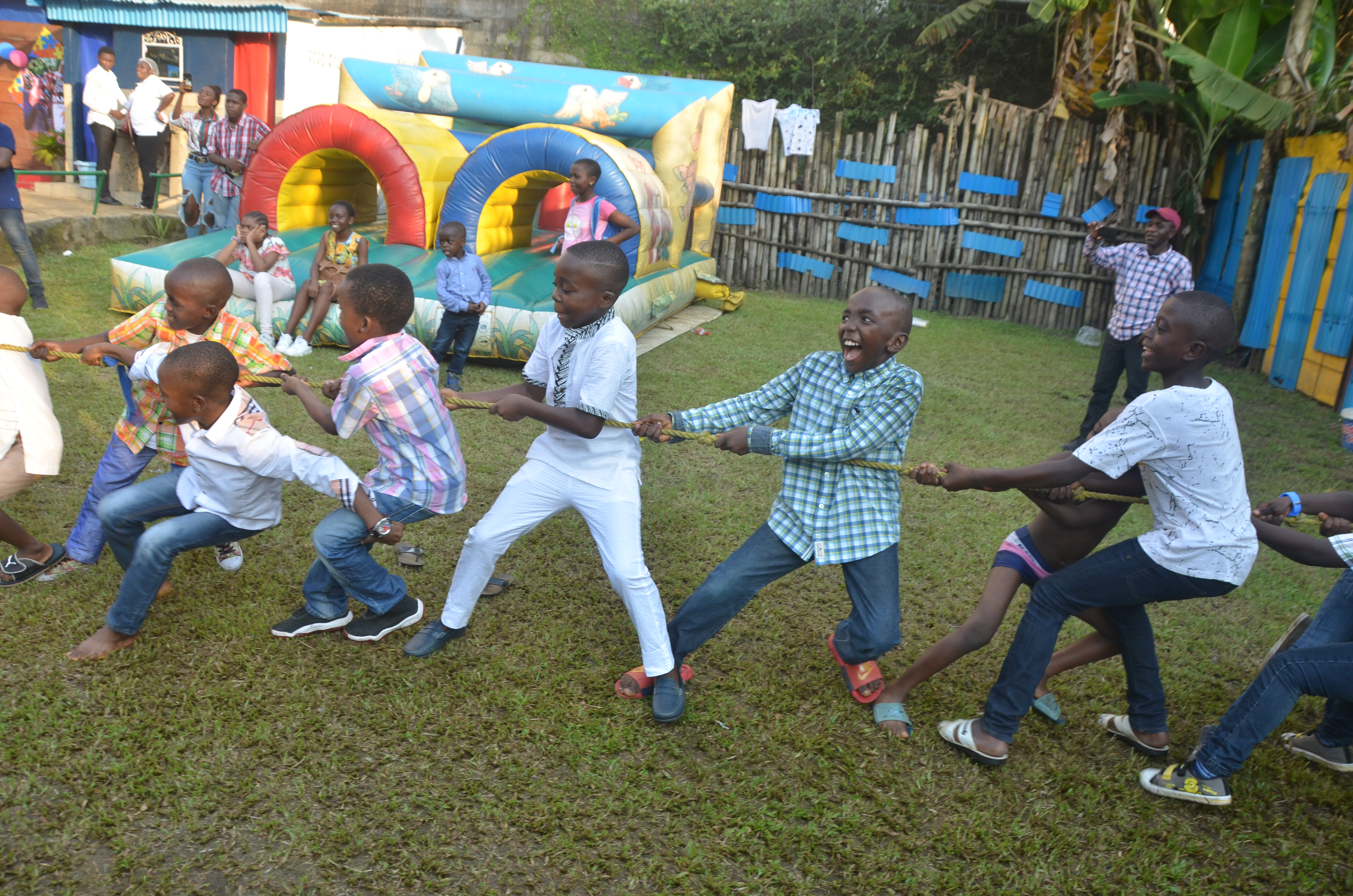
Children in Tug of War game

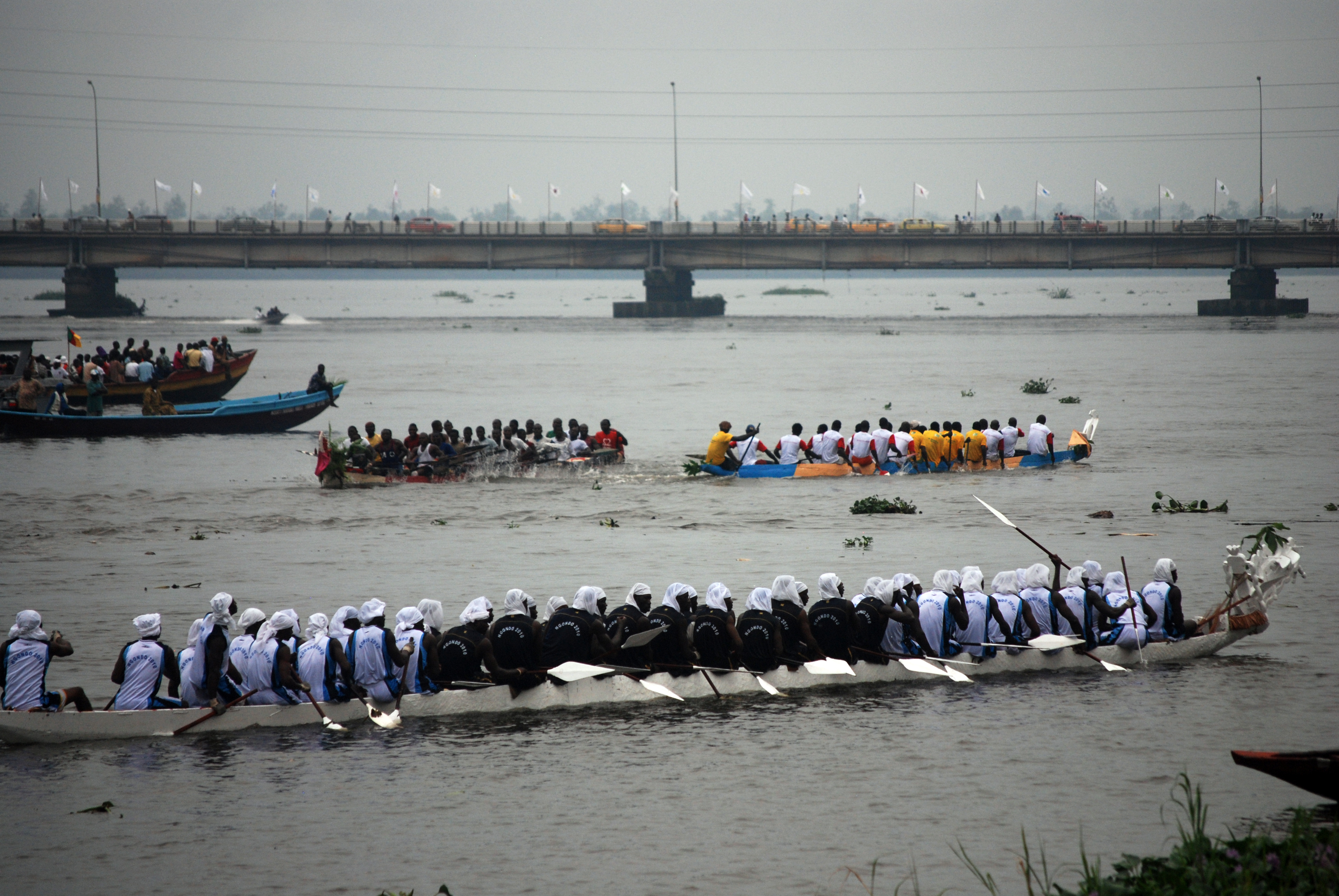
Canoe Race on the Wouri River

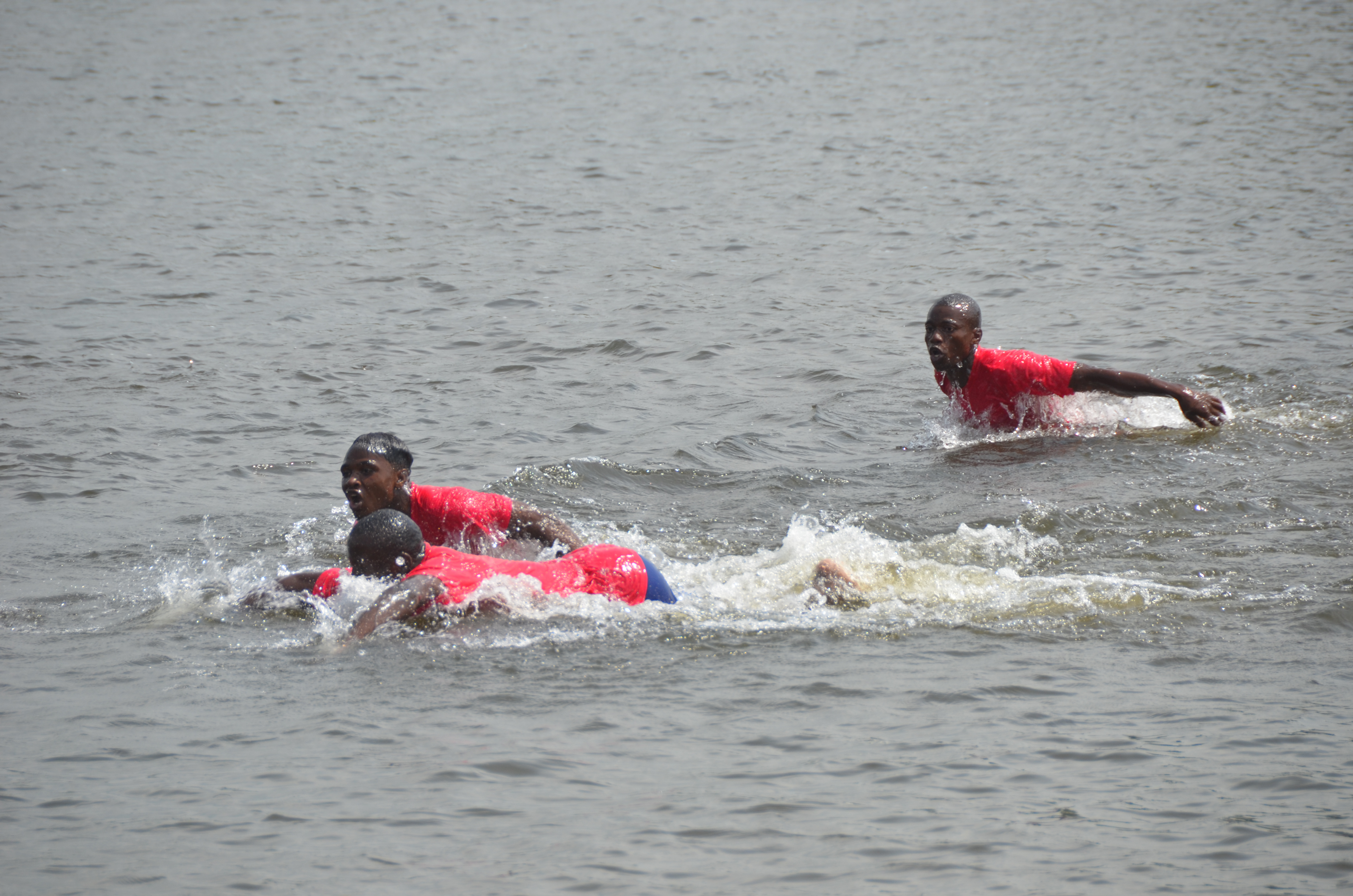
Swimming competition

Sports in Cameroon is practiced widely by the population and advocated by the national government. Cameroonians take pride in victories at international competitions, making sport an important source of national unity. Traditional sports in Cameroon include canoe racing, swimming, tug of war, and wrestling. Wrestling has featured in the initiation rites and other ceremonies of ethnic groups such as the Bakweri and the Duala.

However, in modern times, sports such as basketball, boxing, cycling, handball, netball, caber toss, and table tennis have become popular. The 40 km (24.8 mi) Mount Cameroon Race of Hope draws several hundred runners each year. Tourists hike, rock climb, and mountaineer, especially up Mount Cameroon. Yaoundé, Tiko and Kribi have golf courses. Rugby union is also played, with about 15 clubs and 3,000 players nationally.

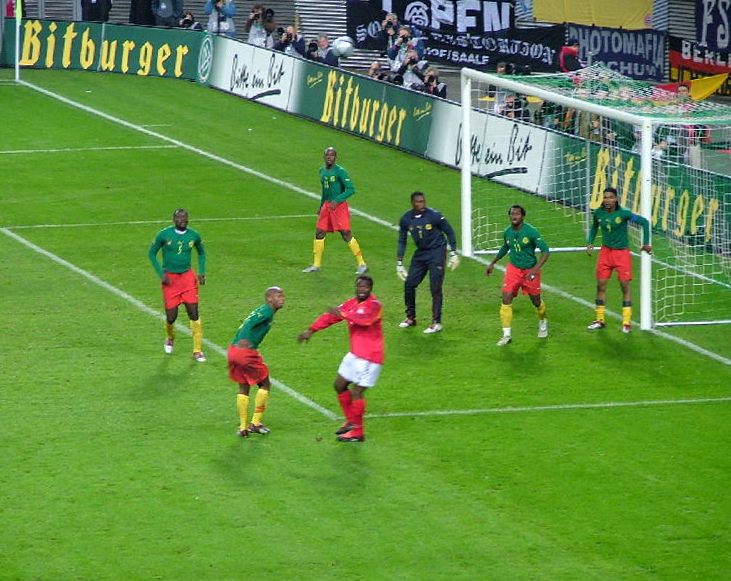
Cameroon faces Germany at Zentralstadion in Leipzig, 27 April 2003.

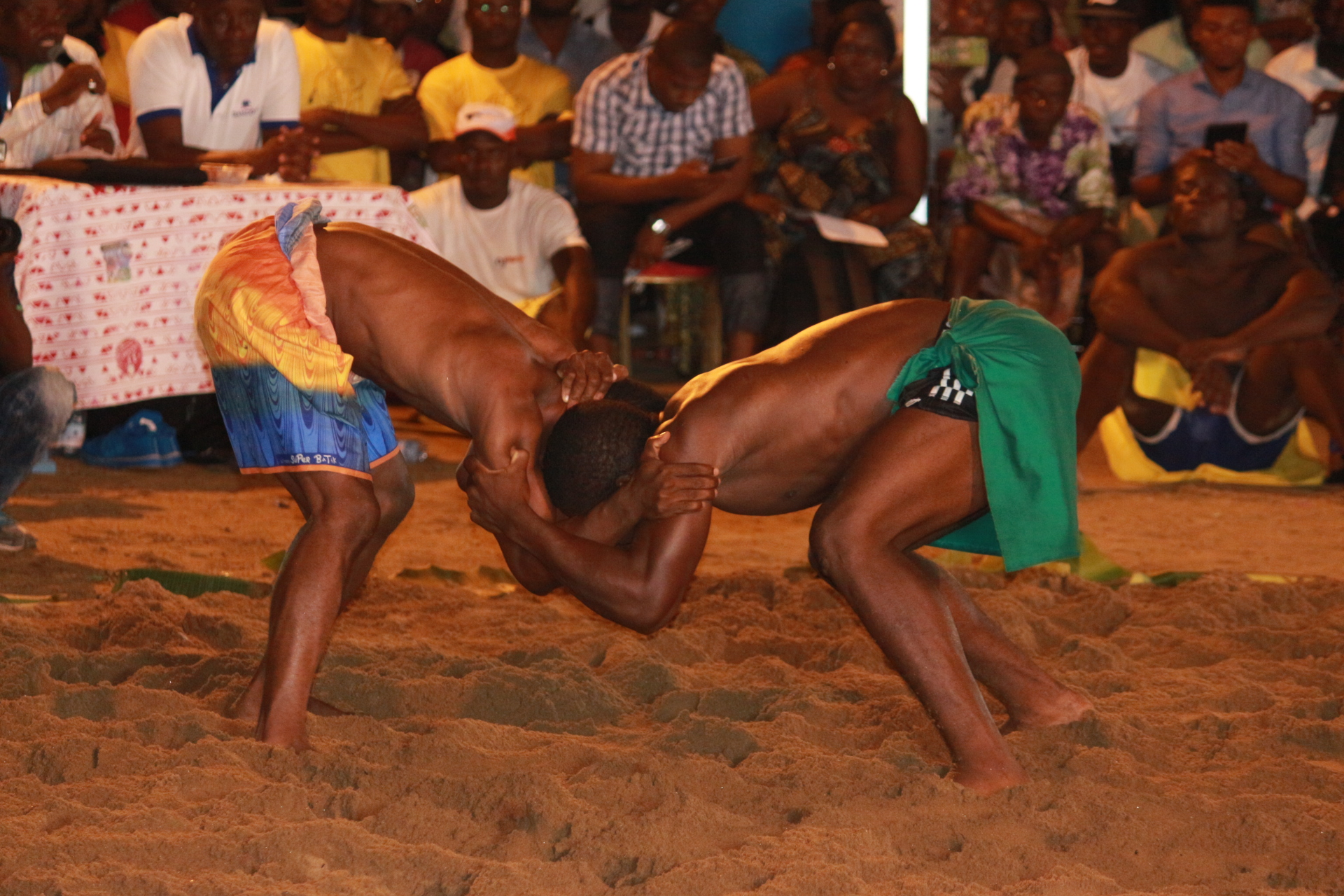
Traditional wrestling

The most popular sport by far is football (soccer). Virtually every village has its own football pitch, and large numbers of spectators watch games between rival villages. The Cameroon national football team has gained world recognition since their strong showing in the 1990 FIFA World Cup. The team has won five African Cup of Nations titles. Footballer Roger Milla is known around the world, and the 2003 death of Marc-Vivien Foé during a game made international headlines. Many Cameroonian footballers have gone on to forge relatively successful careers in Europe, including Christian Bassogog who was named African best player of the 2017 African Nations Cup in Gabon 2017.Rigobert Song and African Footballer of the Year winners Lauren and Samuel Eto'o.

Children begin playing sports in primary and secondary school. At the university level, the National Federation for College and University Sports (FENASCO; Fédération National des Sports Scholaire et Universitaire) organises school competitions. The agency also handles provincial competitions at the primary-school level and national games at the secondary-school level. Many sports have their own organising body, including the Cameroon Boxing Federation (FECABOXE), the Cameroonian Football Federation (FECAFOOT), and the Cameroon Handball Federation (FECAHAND). The Cameroon Olympic Committee is another national sports agency, and Cameroon is one of the few tropical countries to have competed in the Winter Olympics.

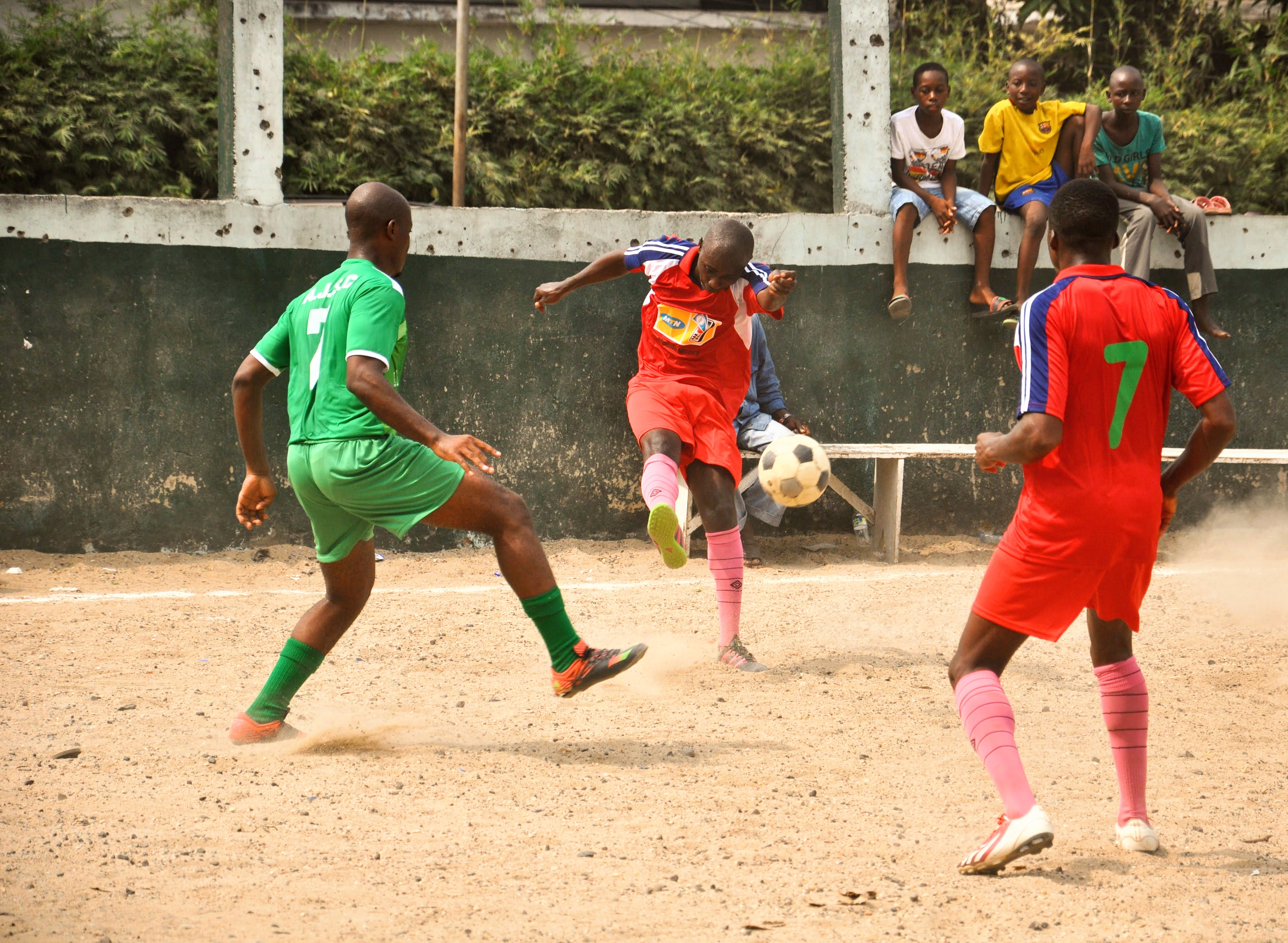
Football match in progress in a local community in Cameroon

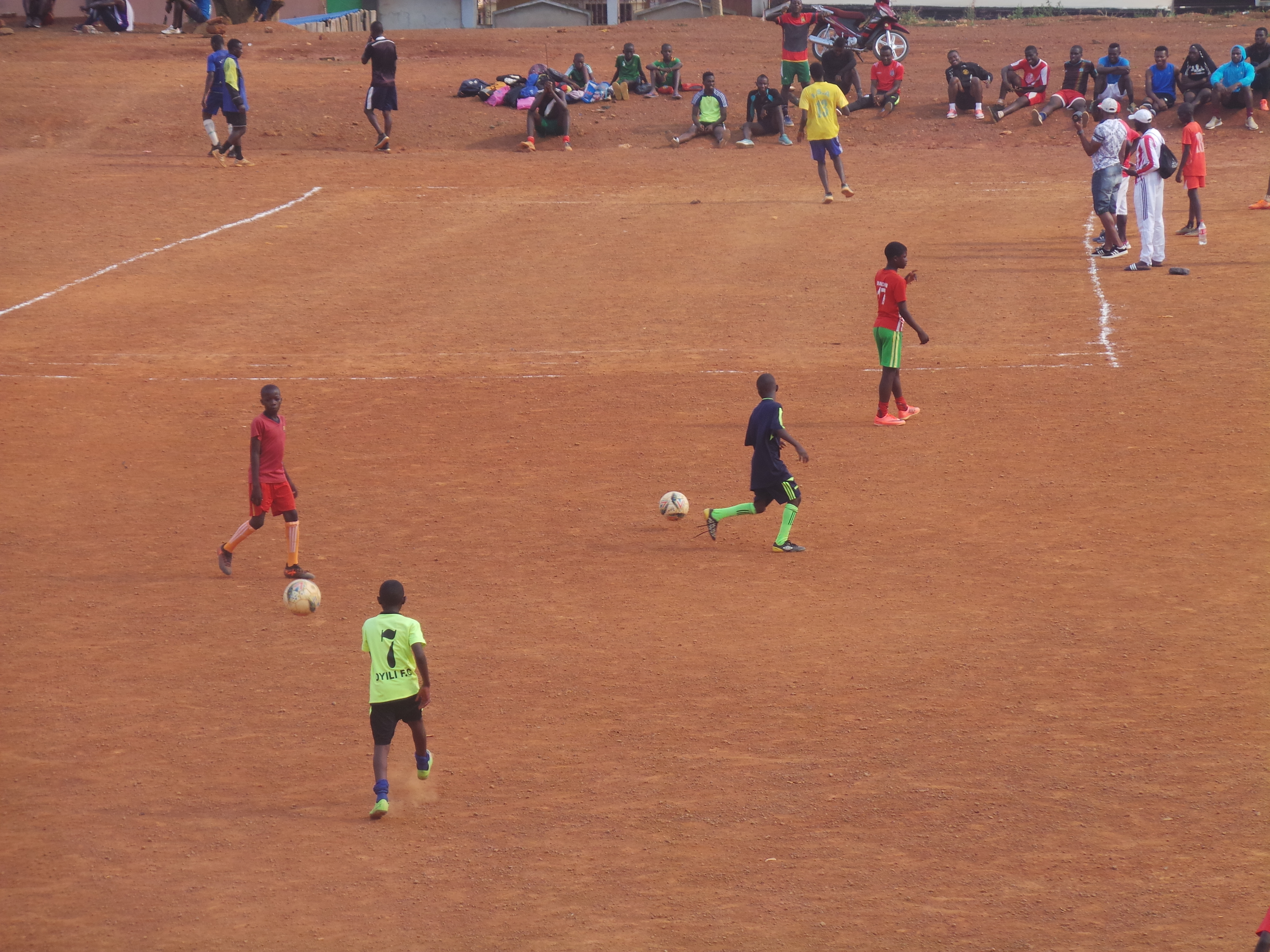
Before a football match in a village in Cameroon

Sports teams are organised along ethnic lines in Francophone Cameroon and under corporate or departmental sponsorship in Anglophone Cameroon. Teams develop fierce rivalries, and violence is not uncommon during matches. Training of athletes is handled by several sports institutes, including some owned by corporate sponsors, such as the Brasseries du Cameroun's l'École de Football des Brasseries du Cameroun (EFBC) in Douala.

UFC Heavyweight Champion Francis Ngannou hails from Cameroon.

The 2026 Commonwealth 100m champion Emmanuel Eseme is also from Cameroon.

== Volleyball ==
The Volleyball Cup of Cameroon takes place on a regular basis. In June 2021, all the women's matches were played at the gymnasium of the National Advanced School of Public Works.

The women's main teams included FAP, Nyong, Kelle, Bafia Volleyball Evolution and Club Efoulan.

Sports Activities

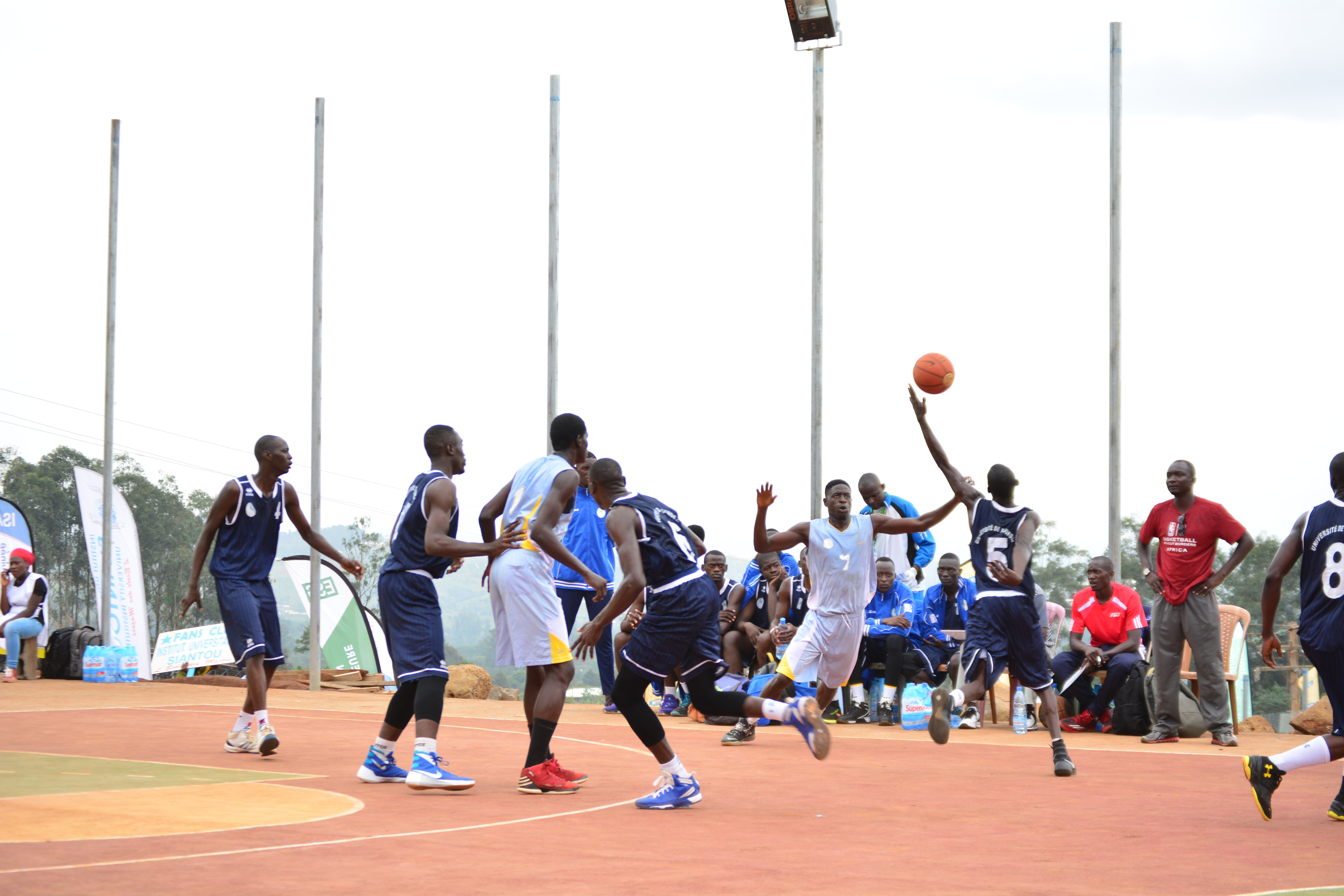
Basketball match during University Games in Buea

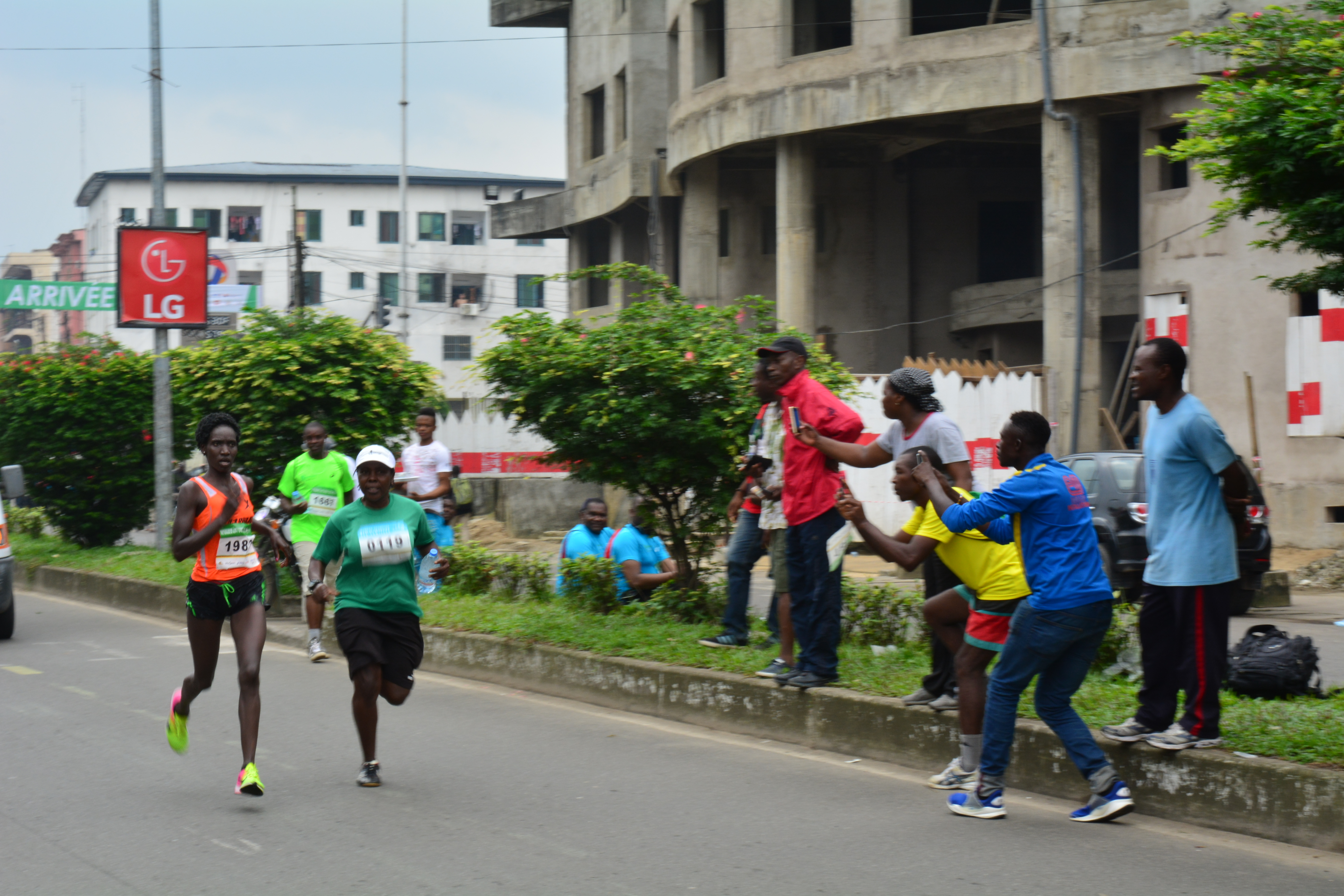
Marathon in Douala

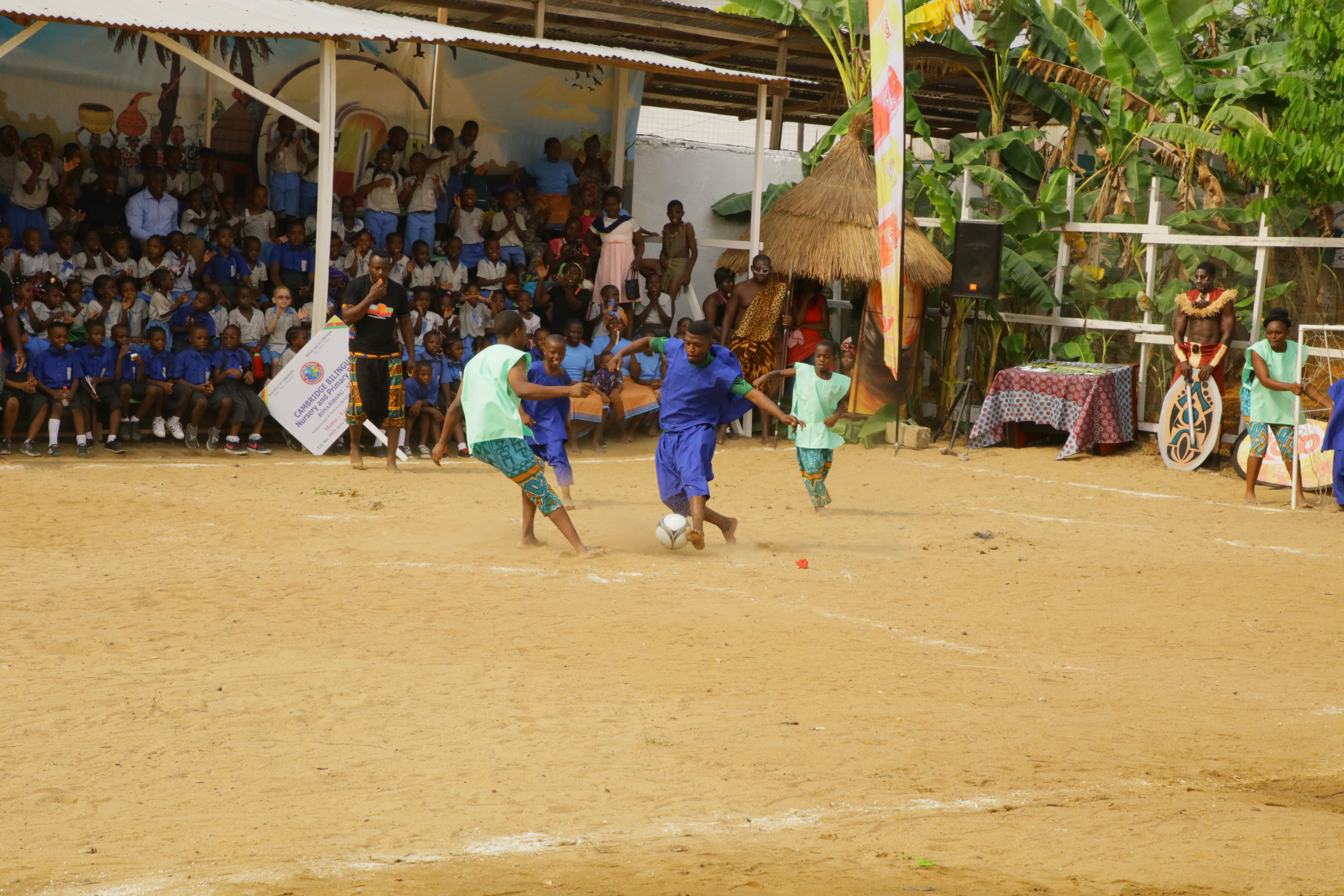
Football match during inter-primary/secondary schools competition

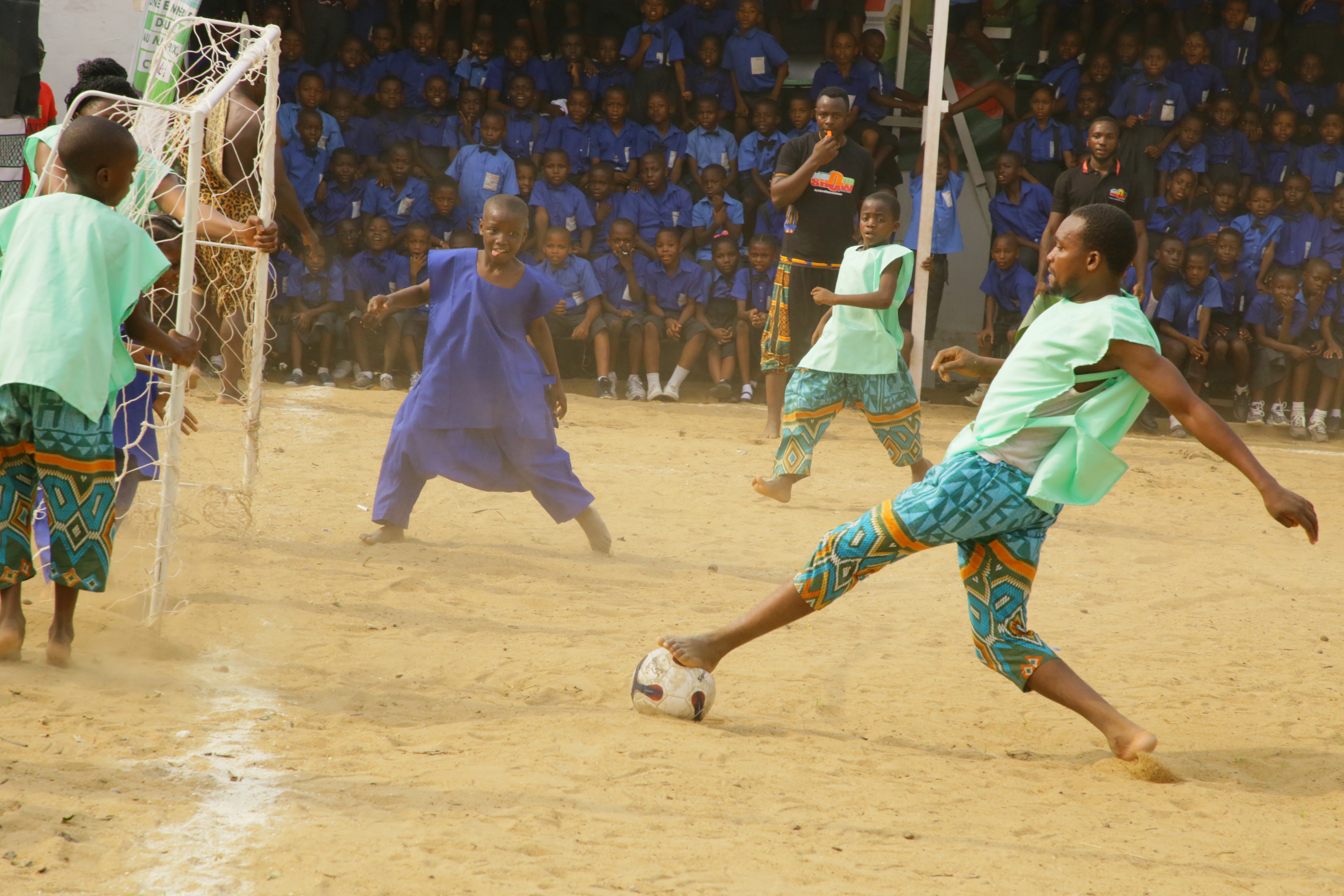

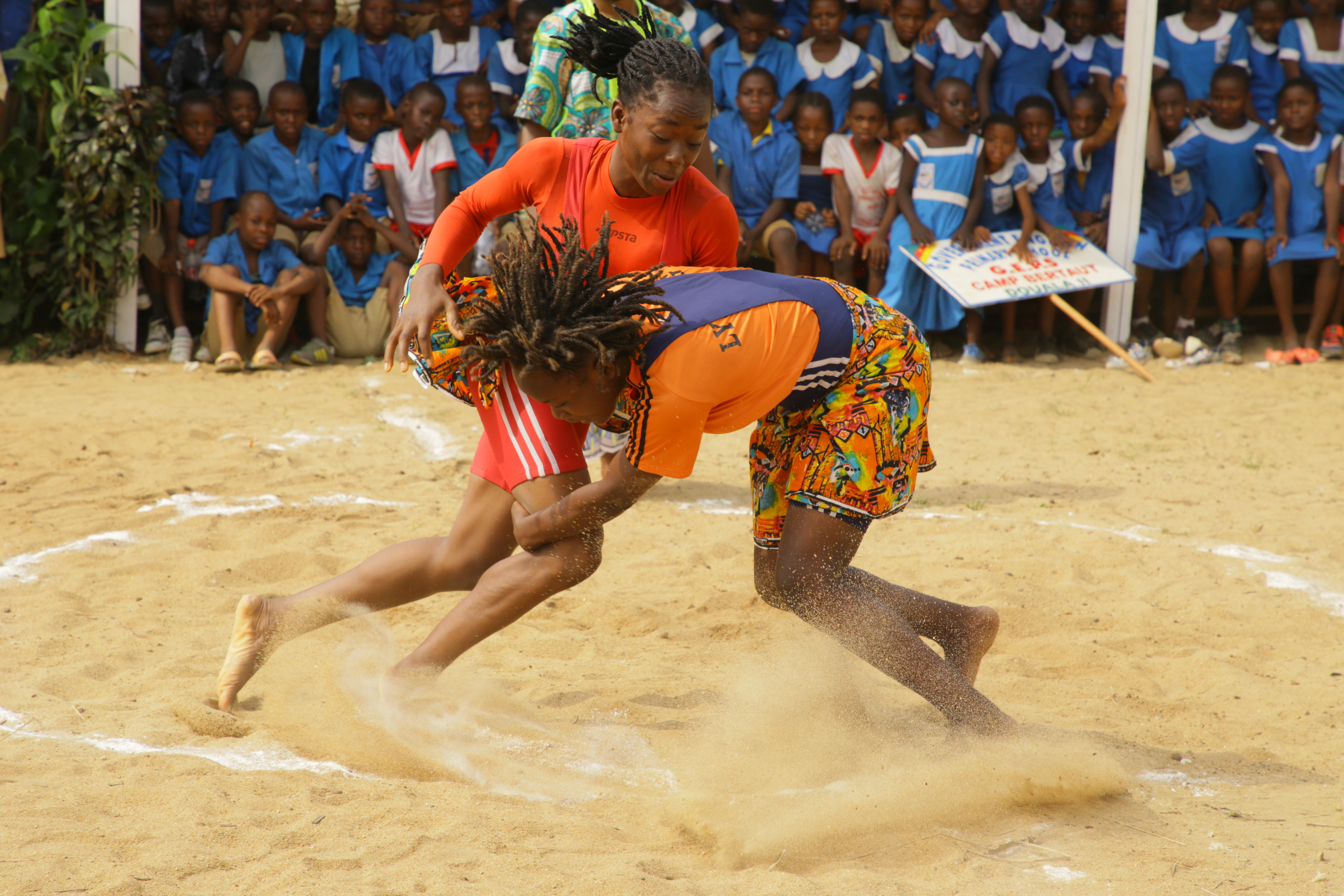
Female Wrestling

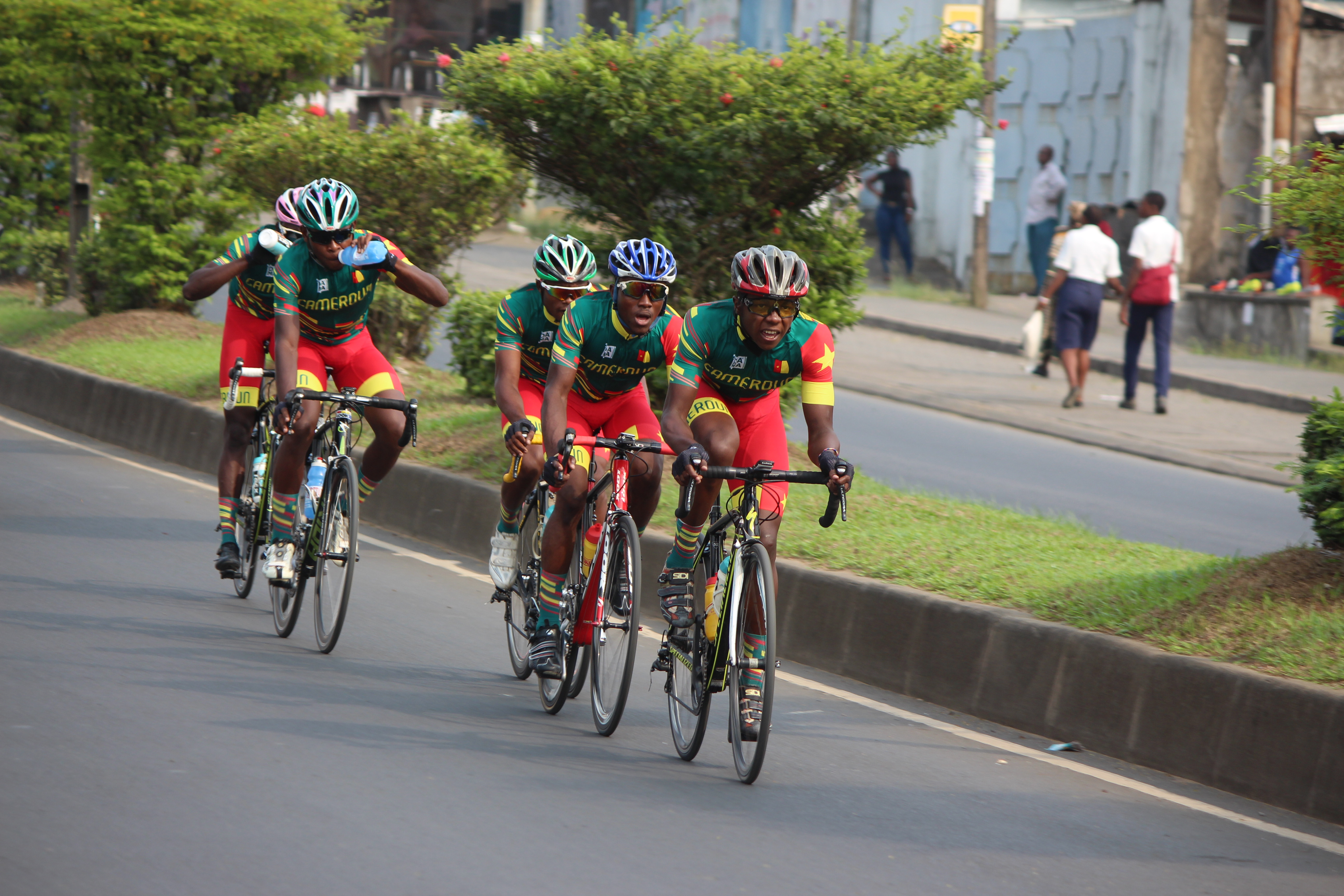
Cycling Tour in Douala

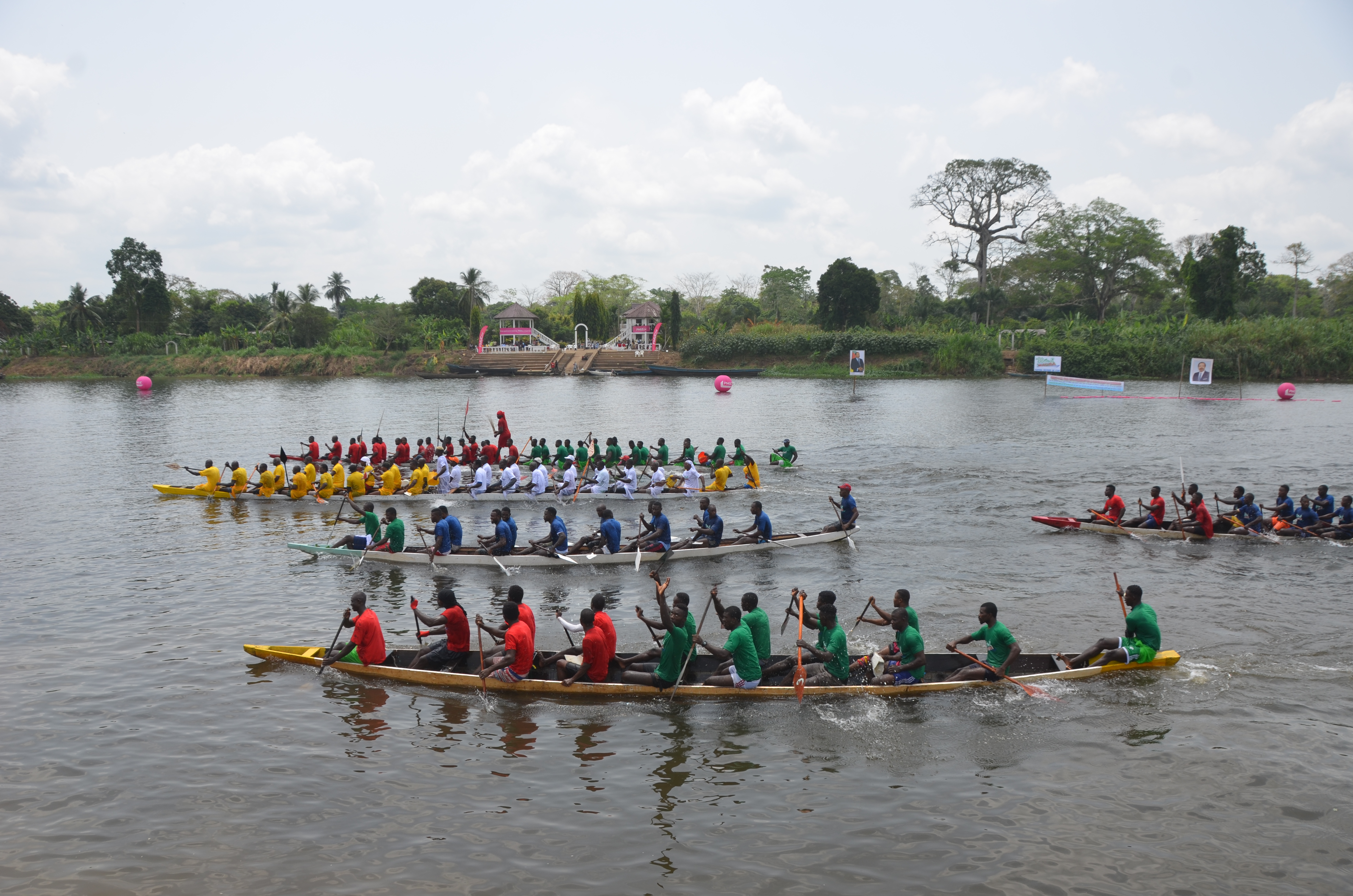
Canoe competition during Ngondo

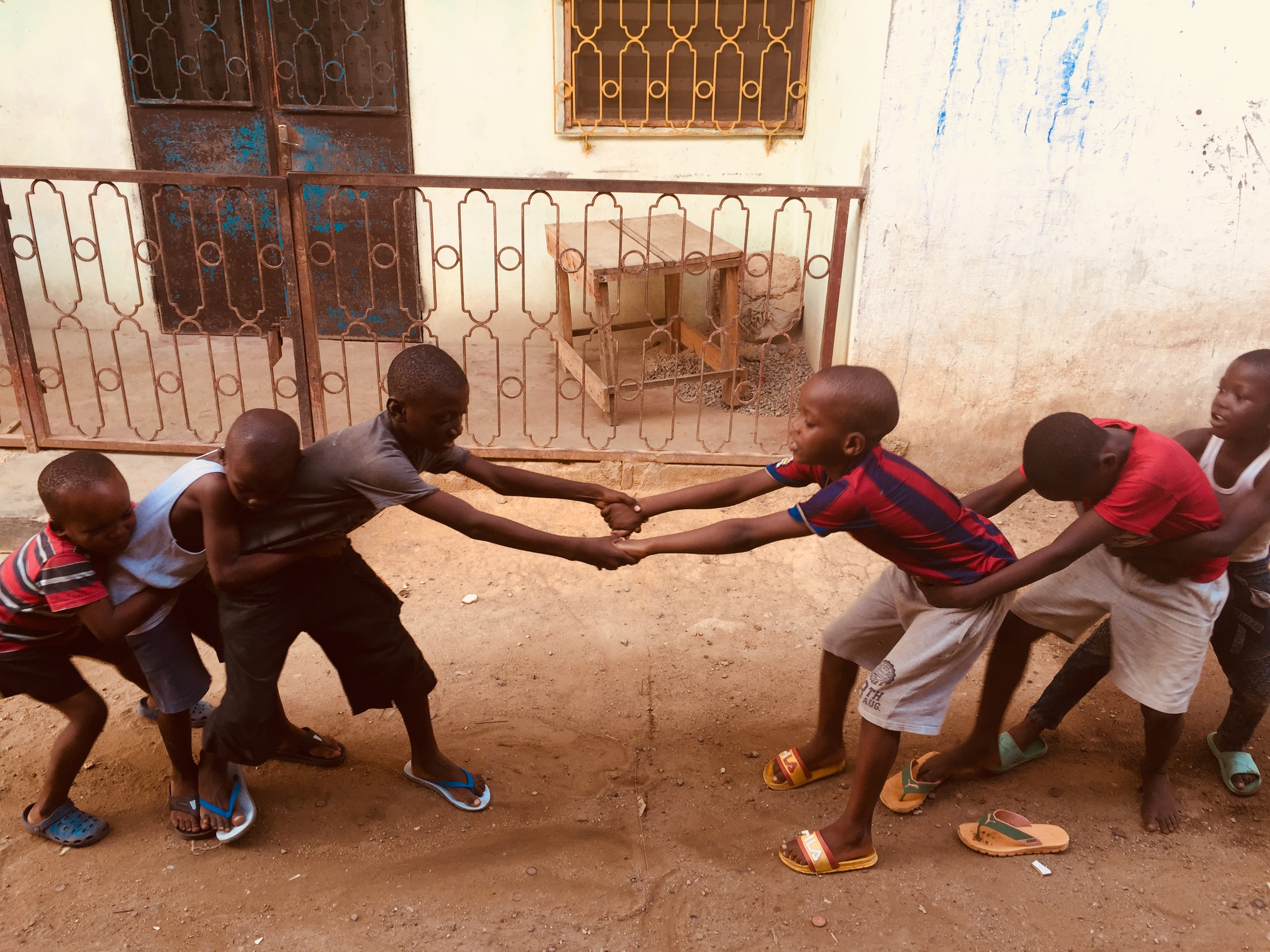
Children engaging in traditional Tug of War game

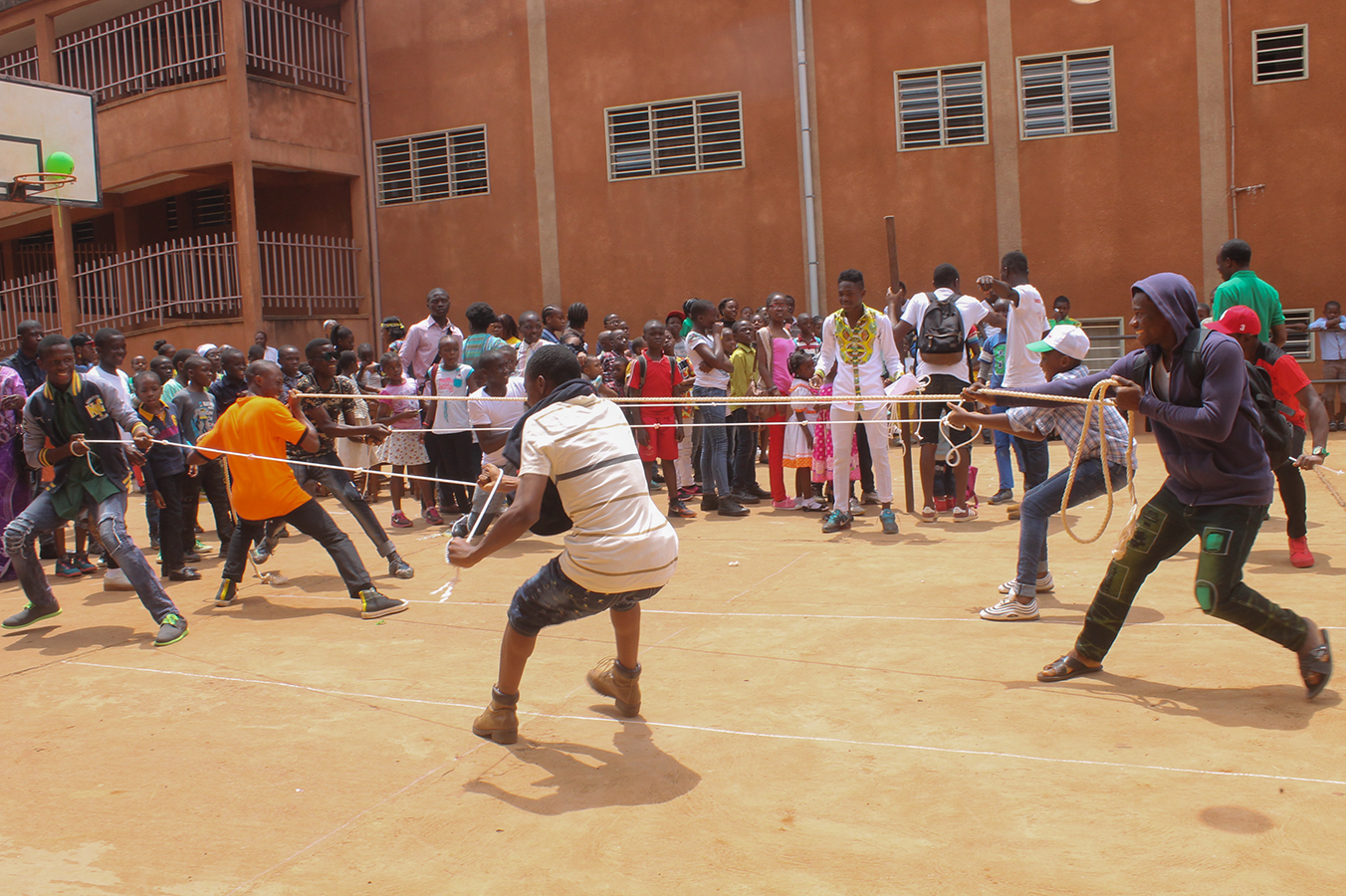

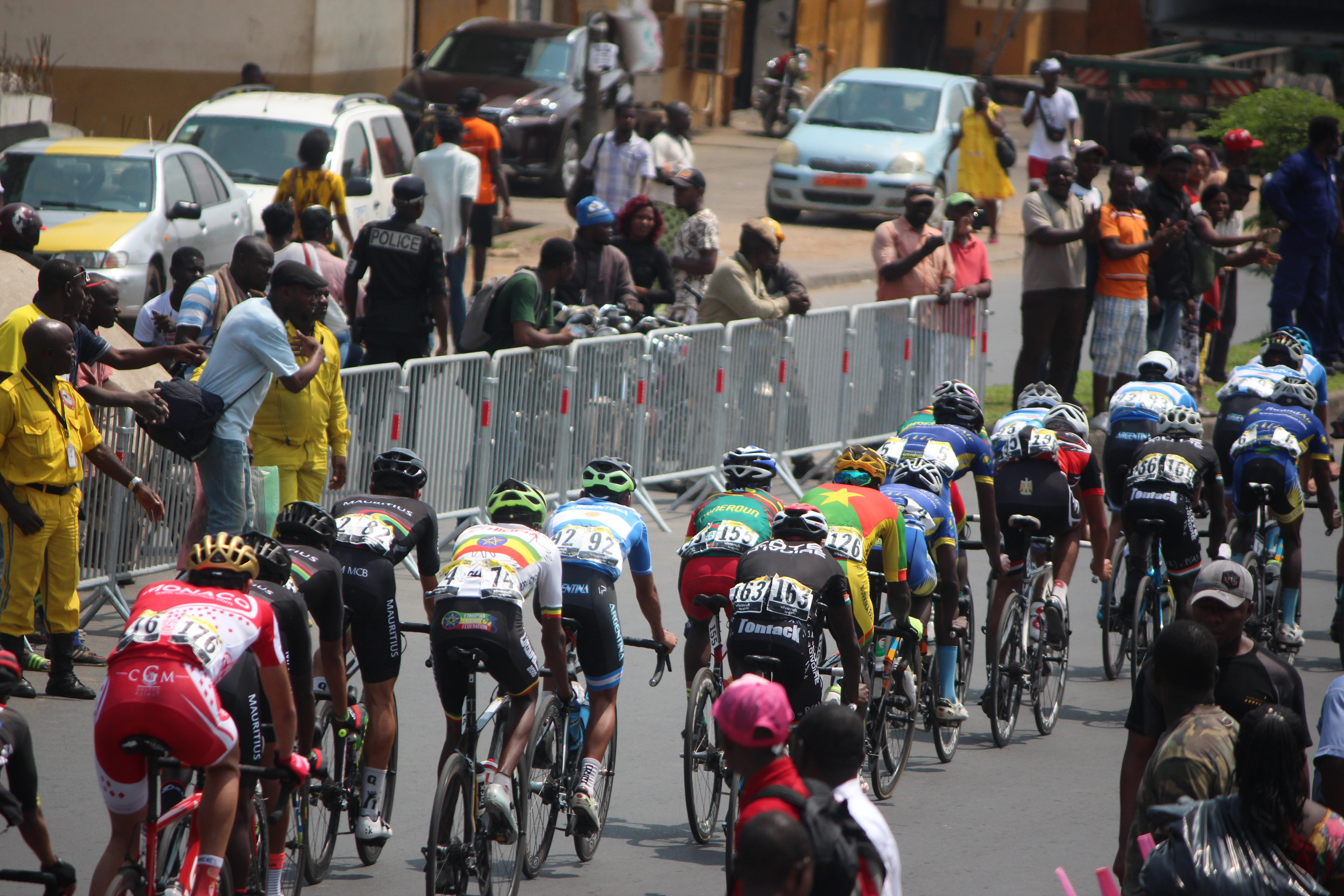

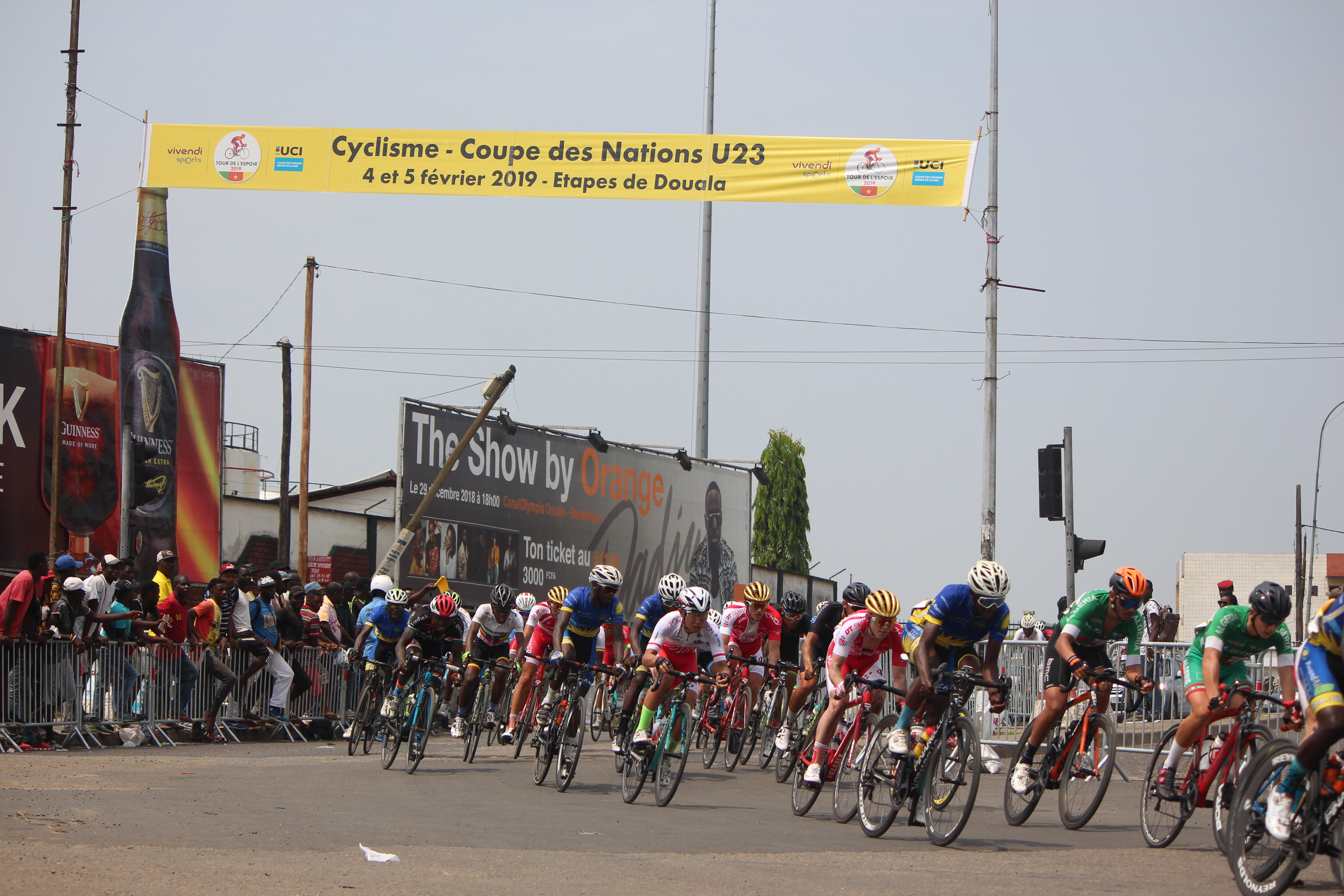

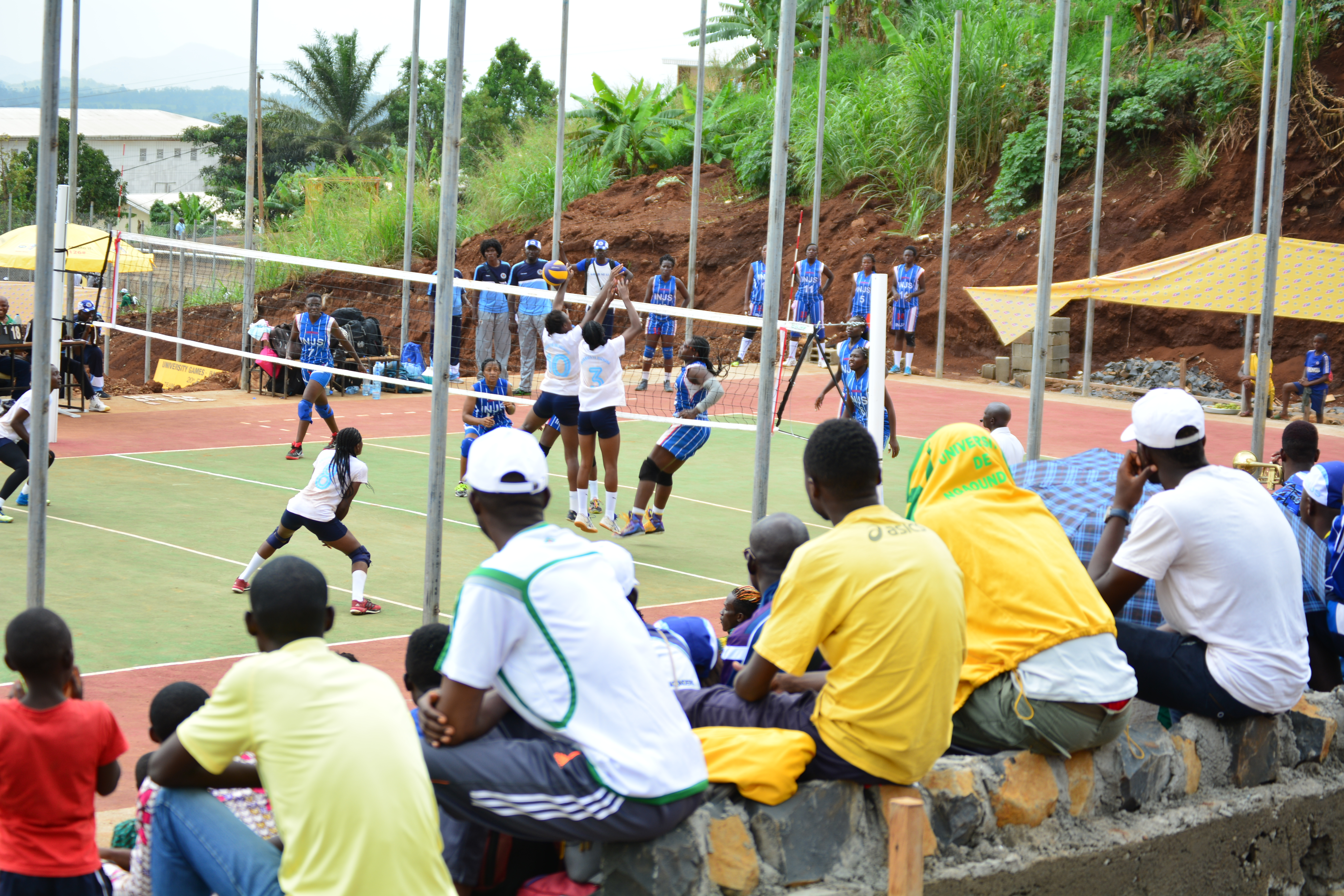
People watching volleyball match

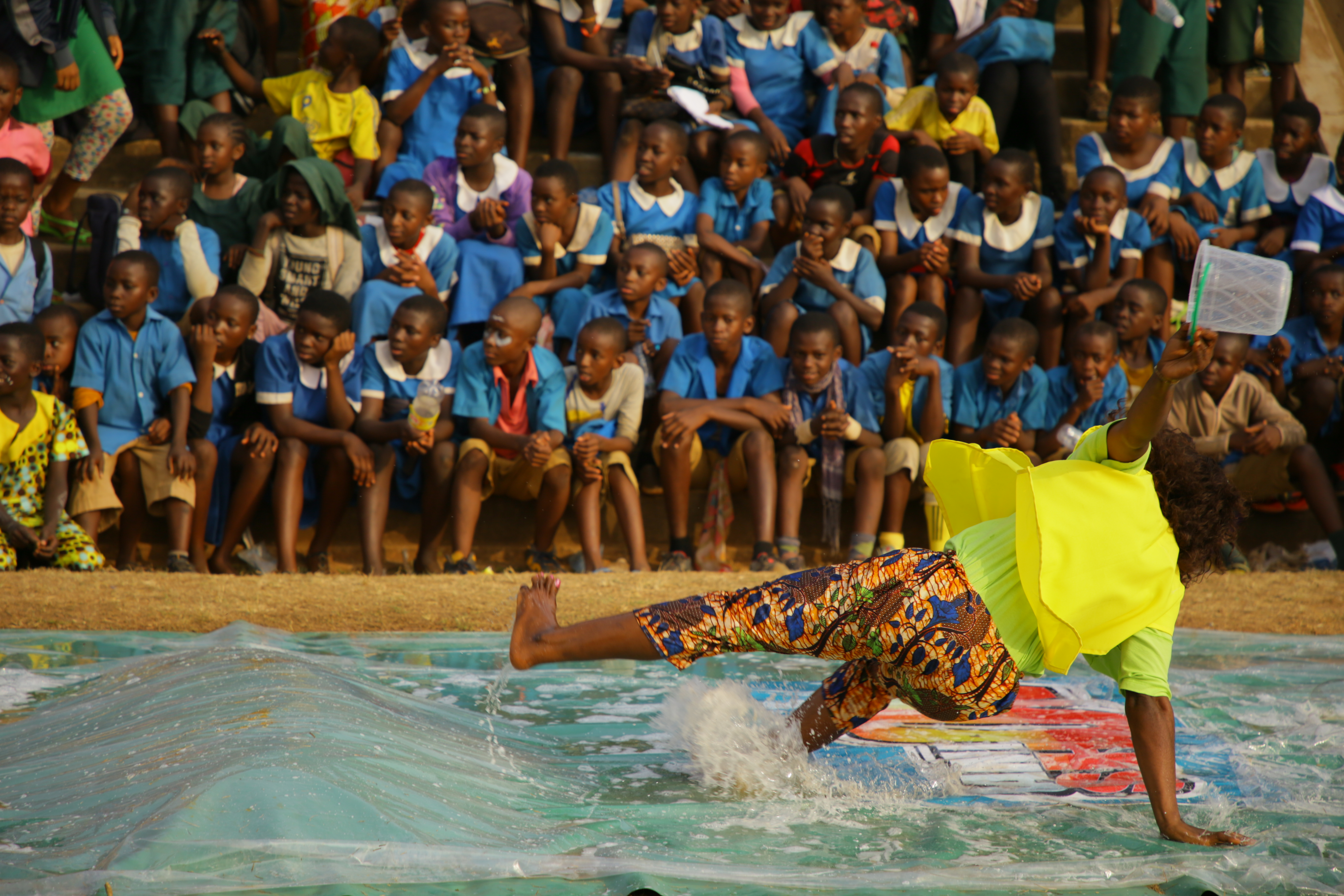
Glissade on water

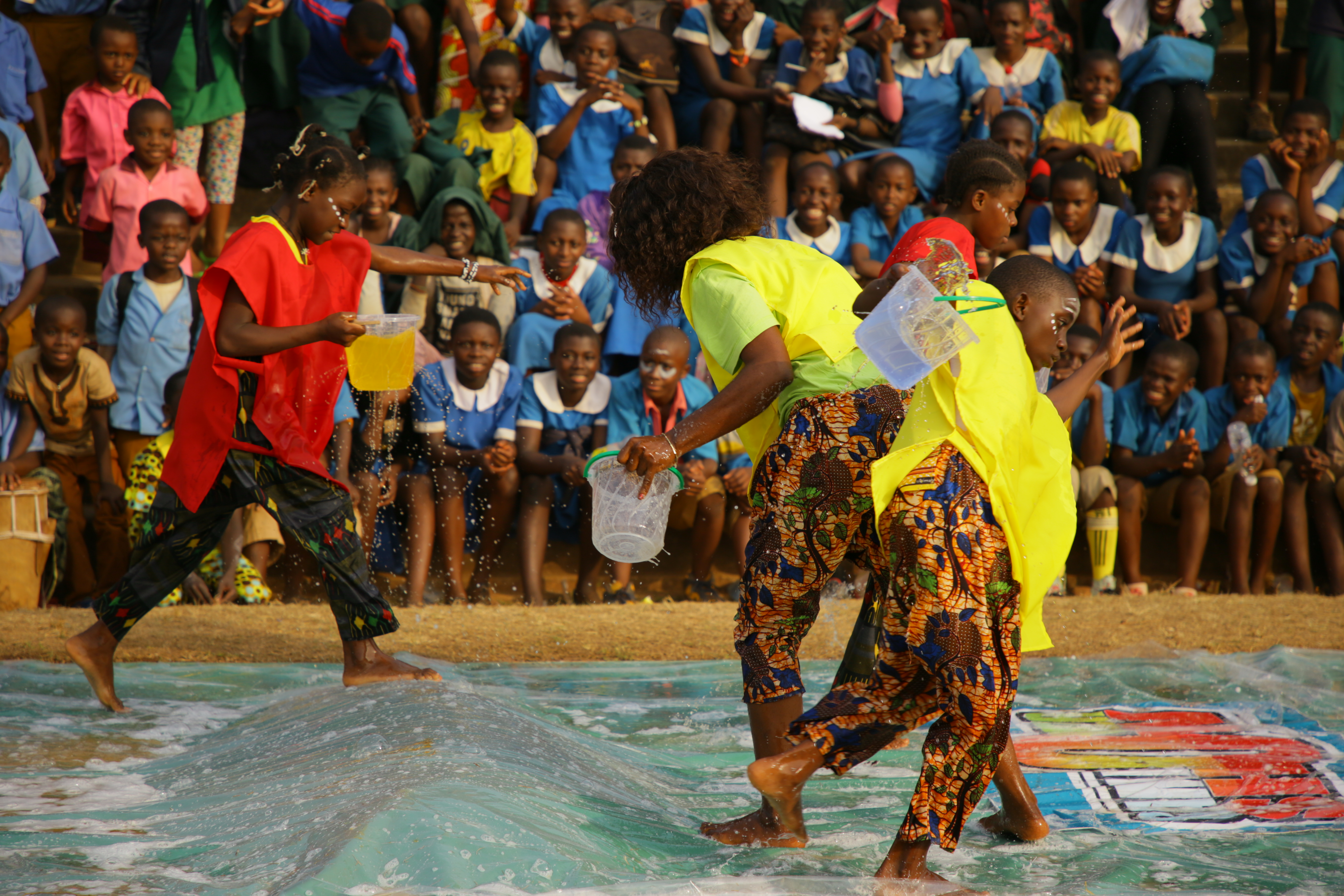
Glissade Competition

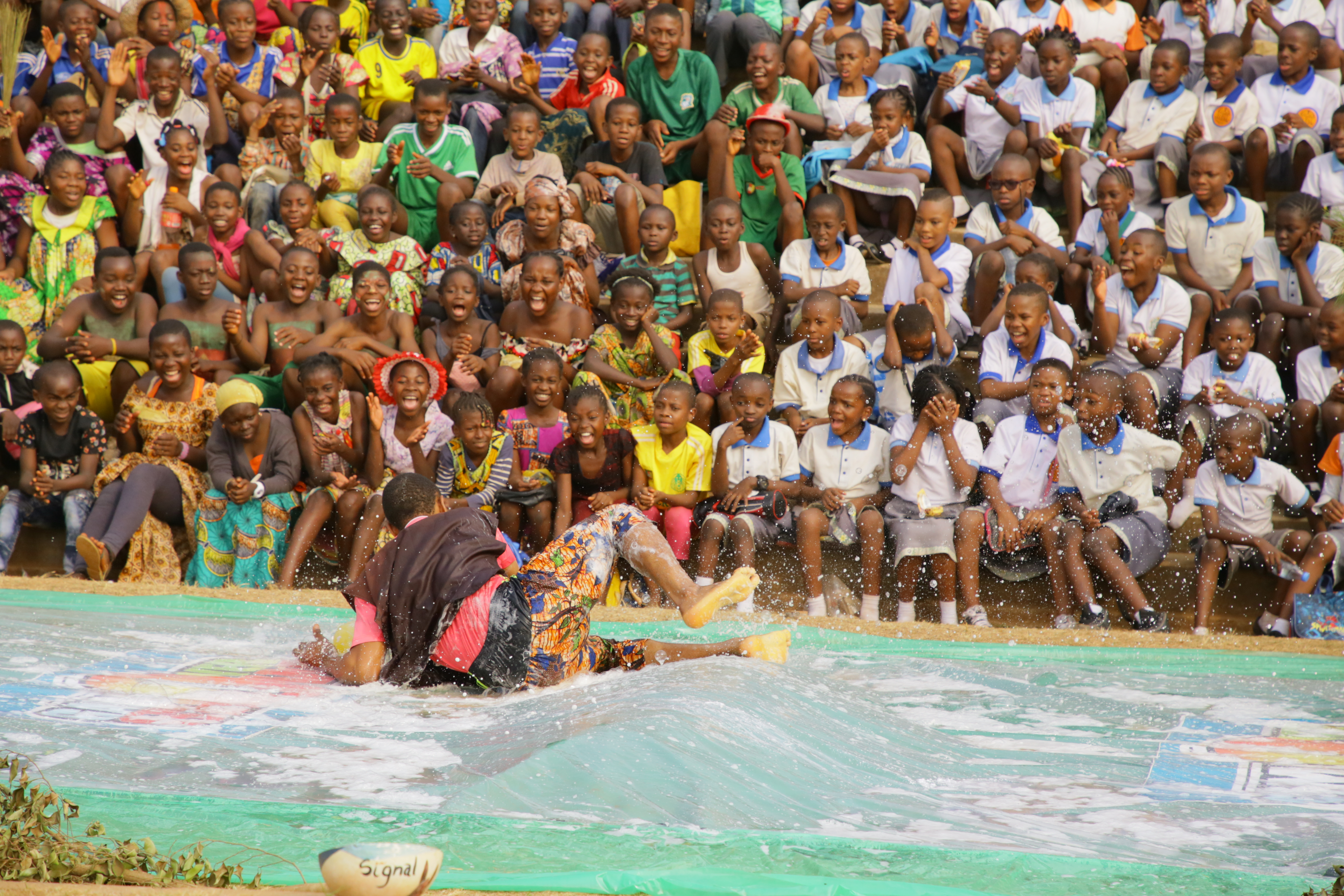

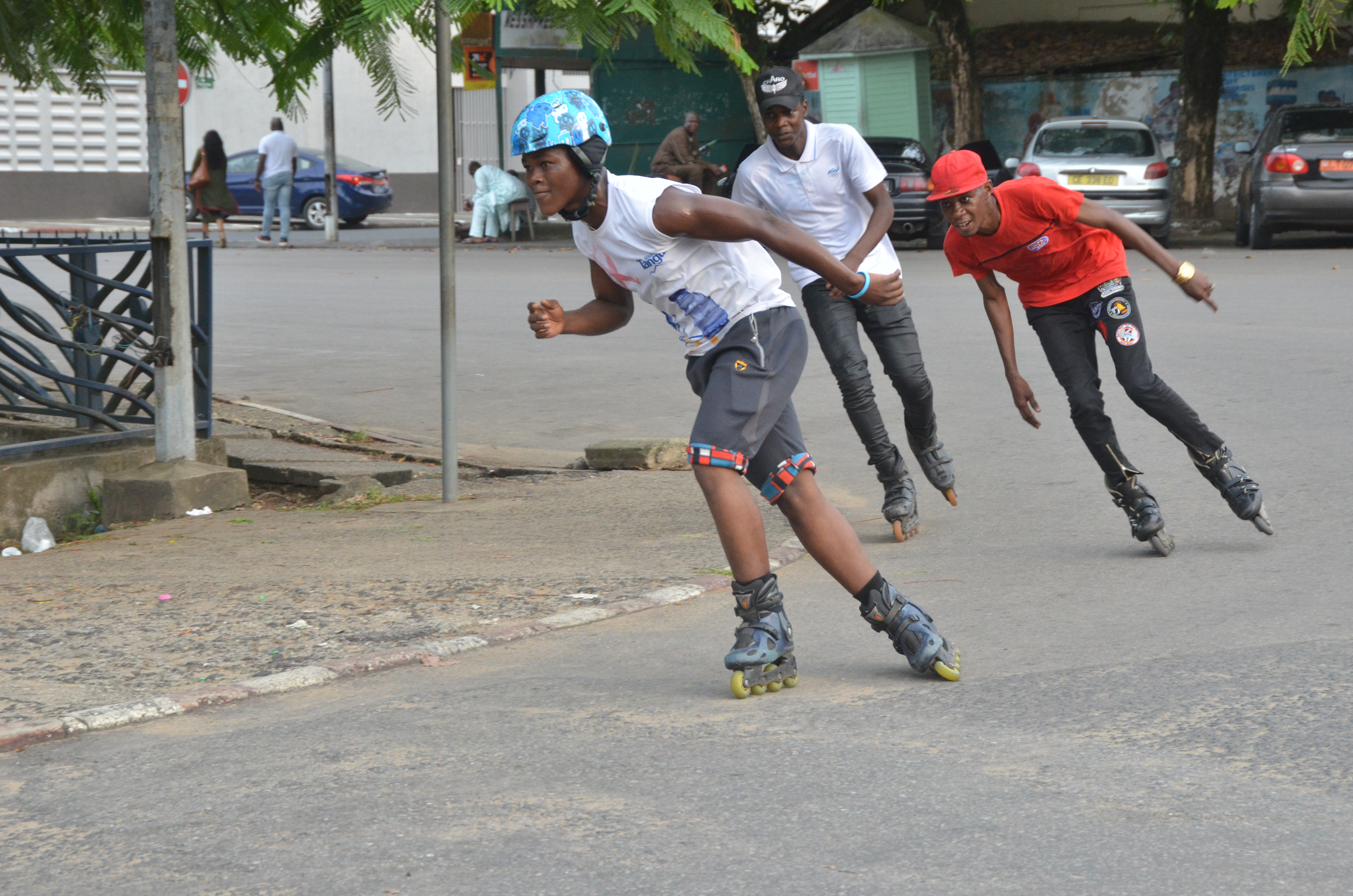

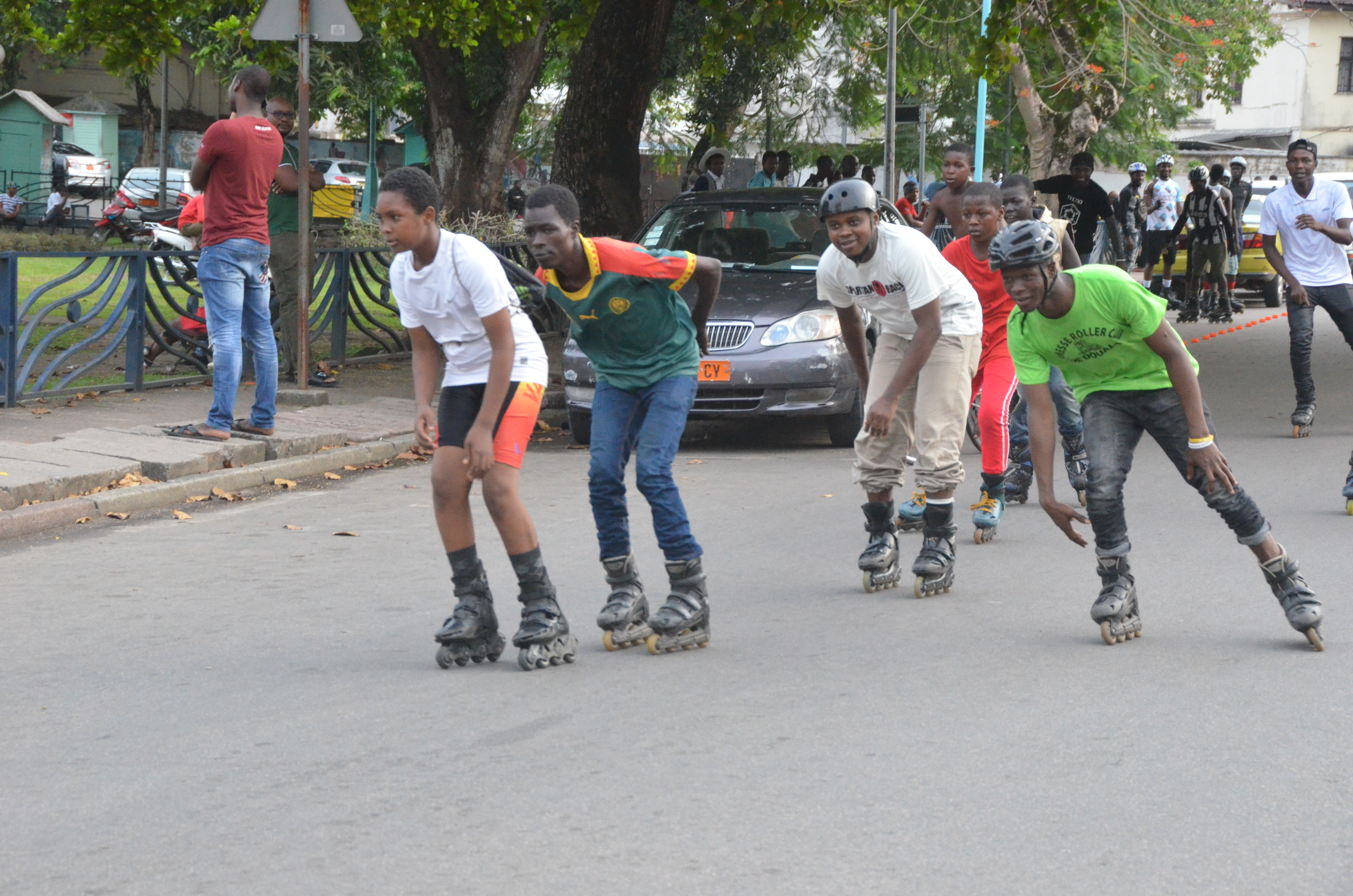

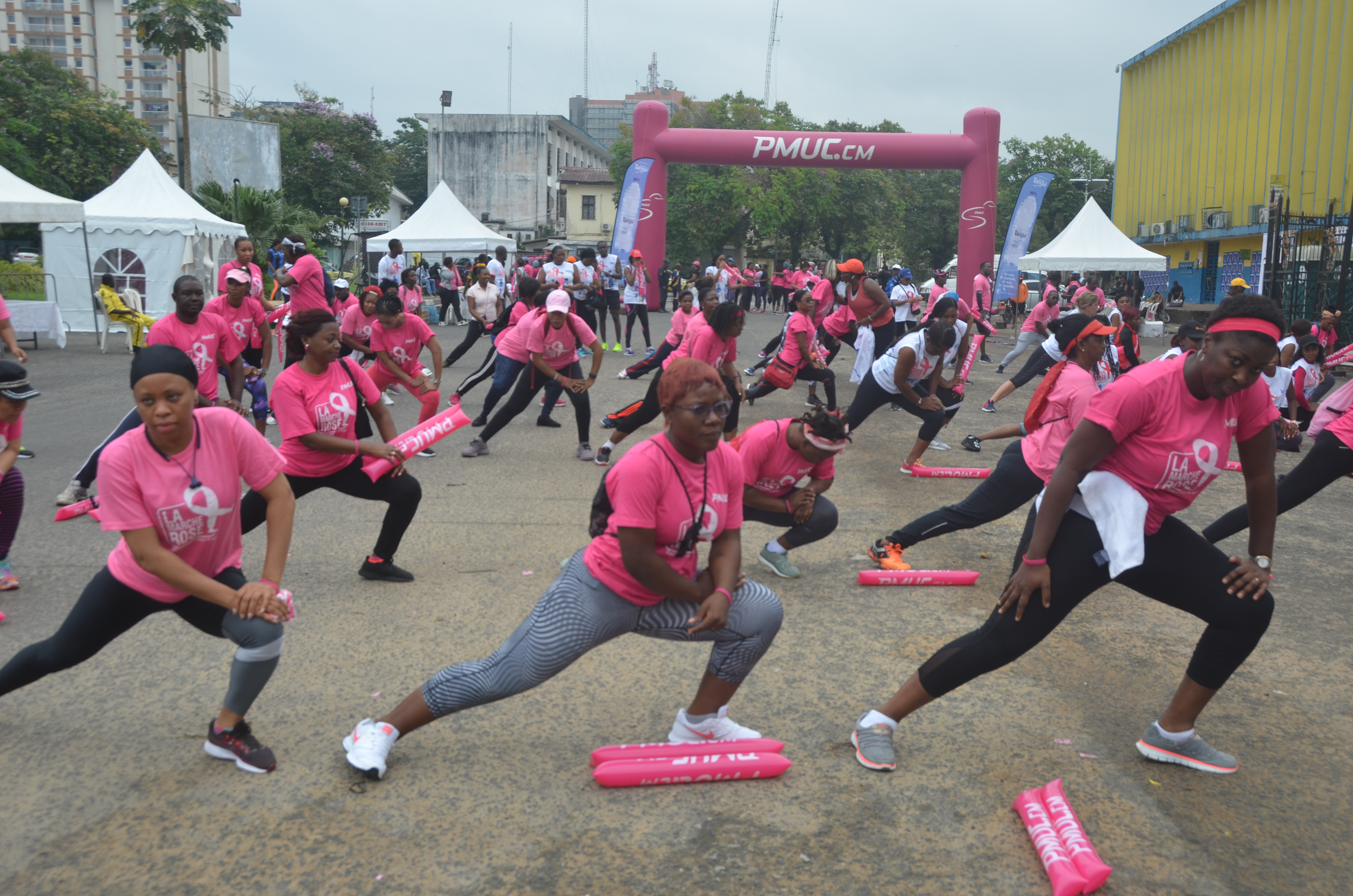
Group sport

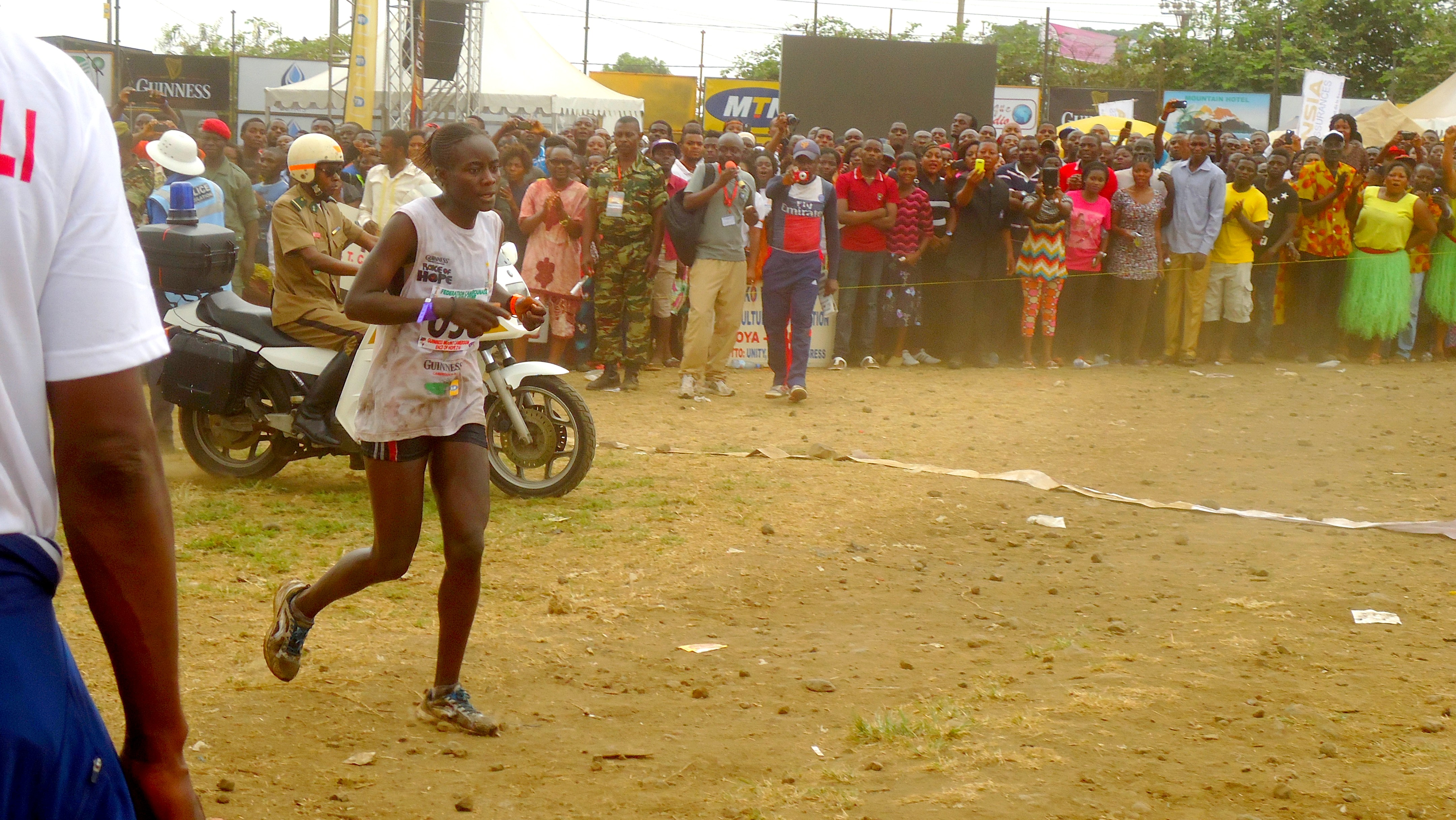
Female athlete during Mt Cameroon race of hope at few meter to the finish line

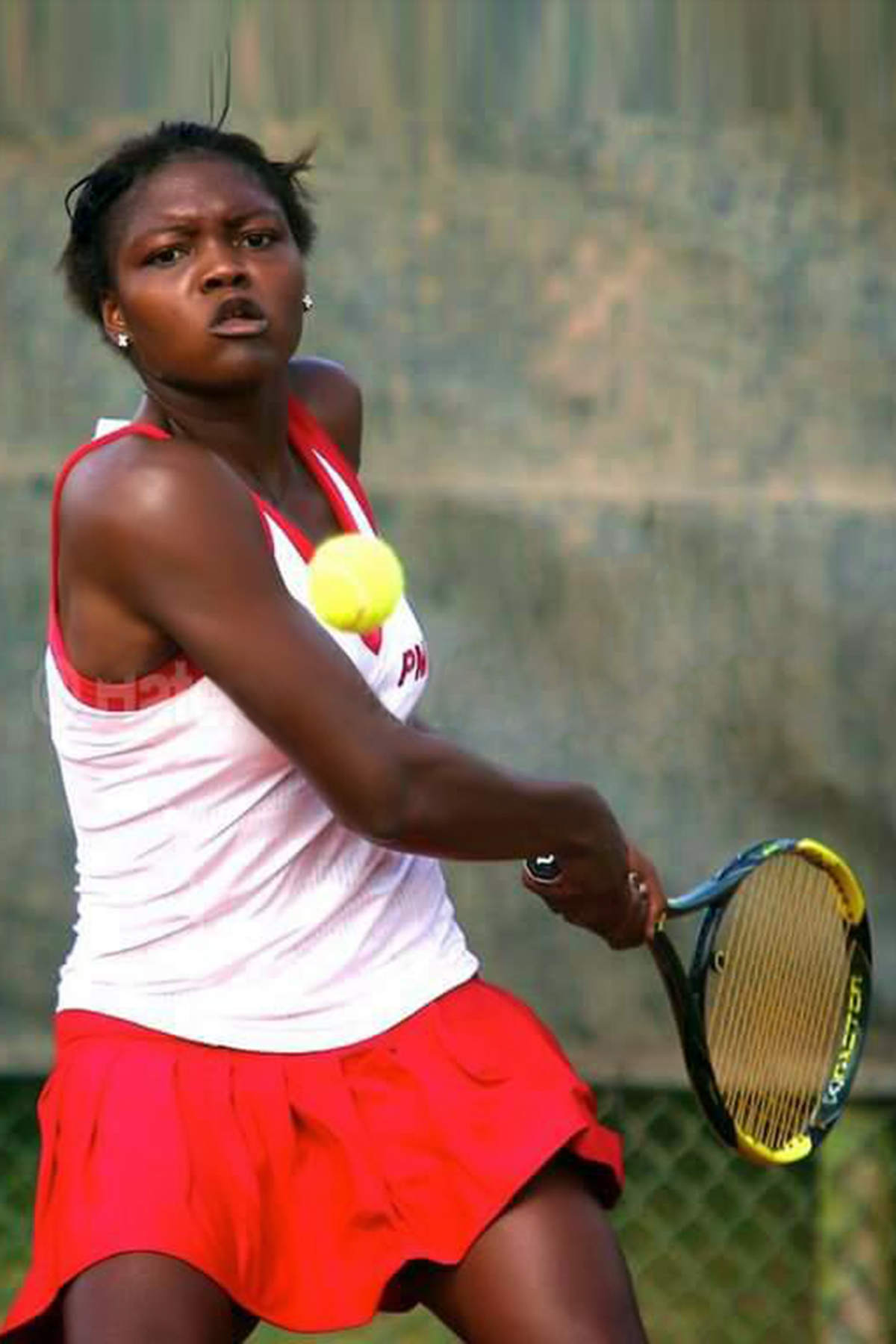

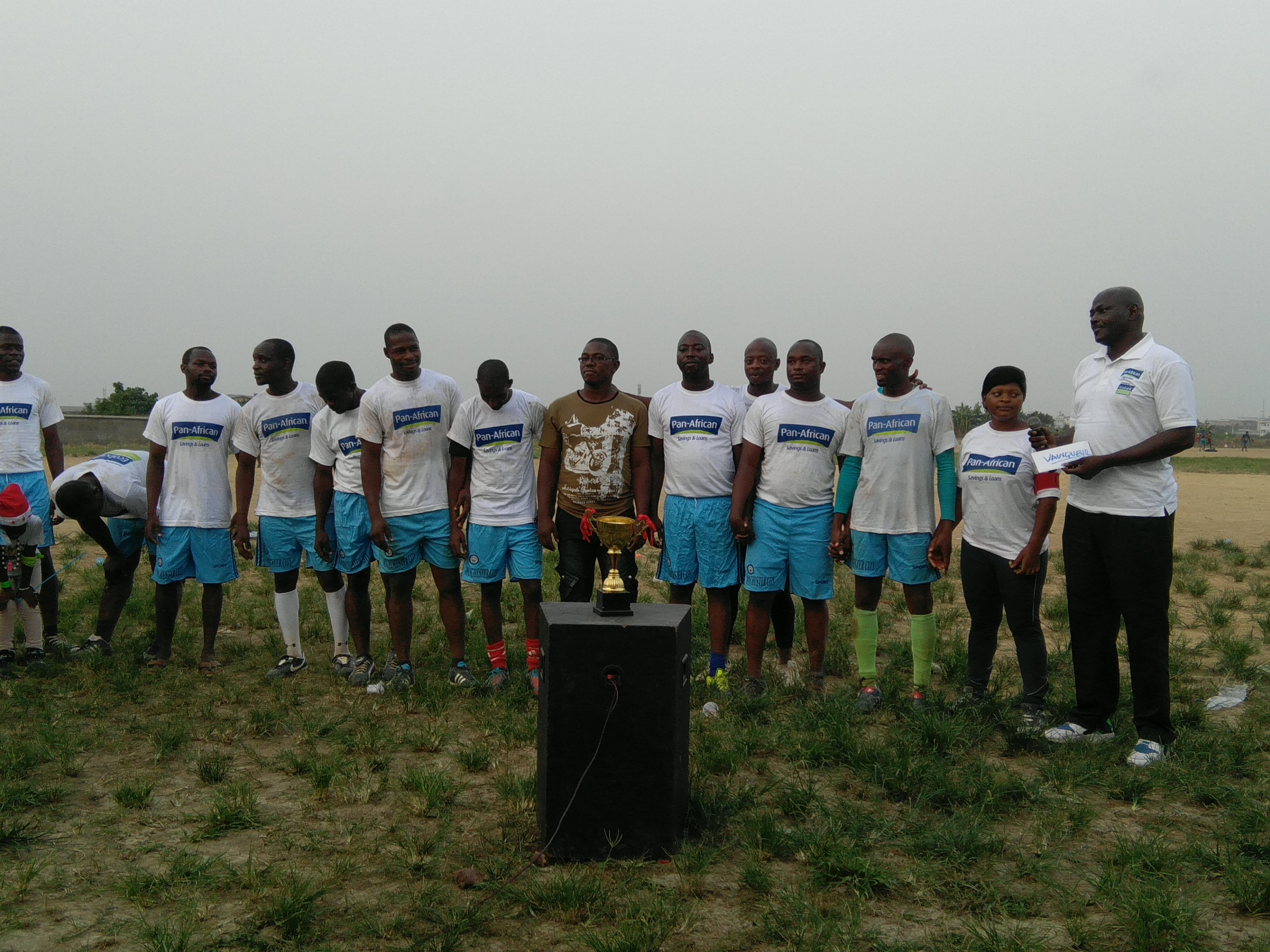
Winners of a football match
