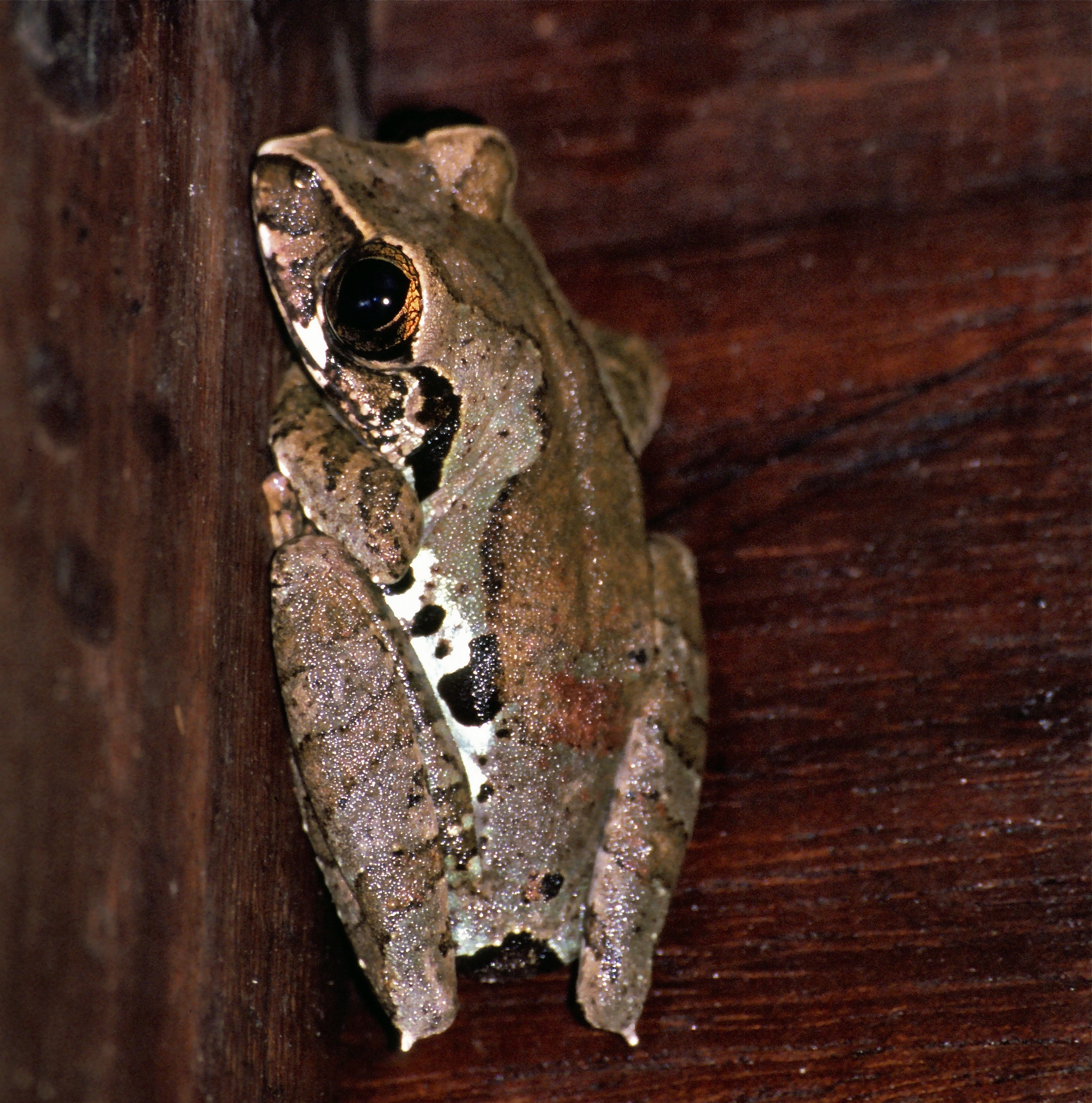

Conservation status
- Least Concern (IUCN 3.1)

Scientific classification
- Kingdom: Animalia
- Phylum: Chordata
- Class: Amphibia
- Order: Anura
- Family: Arthroleptidae
- Genus: Leptopelis
- Species: L. calcaratus

Binomial name
- Leptopelis calcaratus (Boulenger, 1906)

Synonyms
- Hylambates calcaratus Boulenger, 1906

= Leptopelis calcaratus =

Species of amphibian

Leptopelis calcaratus is a species of frog in the family Arthroleptidae. It is found in southeastern Nigeria, Cameroon, the southwestern Central African Republic, Equatorial Guinea (including the island of Bioko), Gabon, the Republic of the Congo, and the Democratic Republic of the Congo. Common name Efulen forest treefrog has been coined for it (part of the type series originated from Efulan).

== Taxonomy ==
Leptopelis calcaratus was described by the Belgian-British zoologist George Albert Boulenger in 1906 based on a specimen collected from "Efulen" in Cameroon (holotype), with additional specimens from "Cape St. John and the Rio Benito District" in Equatorial Guinea; he had previously identified the latter as Leptopelis rufus. Subspecies Leptopelis calcaratus meridionalis from south of the Congo River was described by Raymond Laurent in 1973.

== Description ==
Adult males measure 35–42 mm (1.4–1.7 in) and females 46–57 mm (1.8–2.2 in) in snout–vent length. This species has a characteristic white spur on the heel. The dorsum is greyish with a dark, backward-pointing triangle on the head, and a broad dark dorsal band that is often split up into bars or lateral spots. There is also often a white spot under the eye. The canthus rostralis is angular. Webbing in the feet is extensive.

L. c. meridionalis differs from the nominate subspecies by the spur on the heel being less developed, by having more extensive webbing, and by other small morphological differences.

== Habitat and conservation ==
Leptopelis calcaratus is an arboreal frog found in lowland and montane rainforests at elevations from near sea level to 1,500 m (4,900 ft) above sea level, possibly higher. It does not survive in secondary habitats. If similar to other species of Leptopelis, it would lay eggs in a nest on the ground near water. It is a common species but its habitat is affected by habitat loss caused by agricultural expansion, logging, and human settlements. It occurs in a number of protected areas, including the Korup National Park (Cameroon), Monte Alén National Park (Equatorial Guinea), and Dzanga-Ndoki National Park (Central African Republic).
