= Efoulan =

Coordinates: 2.7833°N 10.5333°E

- Commune and town
- Interactive map of Efoulan
- Country: Cameroon
- Region: Centre Region
- Time zone: UTC+1 (WAT)

Efoulan (Efoulen, Efulan, Efulen) is a town and commune in Cameroon.

The town has one of the nation's top women's volleyball teams.

== See also ==
- Communes of Cameroon
