= List of amphibians of South Africa =

This list of amphibians of South Africa contains species that form a part of the class Amphibia (phylum Chordata) fauna of South Africa. The list follows the South African National Bioinformatics Institute listing.

Amphibians are ectothermic, anamniotic, four-limbed vertebrate animals that constitute the class Amphibia. In its broadest sense, it is a paraphyletic group encompassing all tetrapods excluding the amniotes (tetrapods with an amniotic membrane, such as modern reptiles, birds and mammals). All extant (living) amphibians belong to the monophyletic subclass Lissamphibia, with three living orders: Anura (frogs and toads), Urodela (salamanders), and Gymnophiona (caecilians). Evolved to be mostly semiaquatic, amphibians have adapted to inhabit a wide variety of habitats, with most species living in freshwater, wetland or terrestrial ecosystems (such as riparian woodland, fossorial and even arboreal habitats). Their life cycle typically starts out as aquatic larvae with gills known as tadpoles, but some species have developed behavioural adaptations to bypass this.

Young amphibians generally undergo metamorphosis from an aquatic larval form with gills to an air-breathing adult form with lungs. Amphibians use their skin as a secondary respiratory interface and some small terrestrial salamanders and frogs lack lungs and rely entirely on their skin. They are superficially similar to reptiles like lizards, but unlike reptiles and other amniotes, require access to water bodies to breed. With their complex reproductive needs and permeable skins, amphibians are often ecological indicators to habitat conditions; in recent decades there has been a dramatic decline in amphibian populations for many species around the globe.

The earliest amphibians evolved in the Devonian period from tetrapodomorph sarcopterygians (lobe-finned fish with articulated limb-like fins) that evolved primitive lungs, which were helpful in adapting to dry land. They diversified and became ecologically dominant during the Carboniferous and Permian periods, but were later displaced in terrestrial environments by early reptiles and basal synapsids (predecessors of mammals). The origin of modern lissamphibians, which first appeared during the Early Triassic, around 250 million years ago, has long been contentious. The most popular hypothesis is that they likely originated from temnospondyls, the most diverse group of prehistoric amphibians, during the Permian period. Another hypothesis is that they emerged from lepospondyls. A fourth group of lissamphibians, the Albanerpetontidae, became extinct around 2 million years ago.

The number of known amphibian species is approximately 8,000, of which nearly 90% are frogs. The smallest amphibian (and vertebrate) in the world is a frog from New Guinea (Paedophryne amauensis) with a length of just 7.7 mm (0.30 in). The largest living amphibian is the 1.8 m (5 ft 11 in) South China giant salamander (Andrias sligoi), but this is dwarfed by prehistoric temnospondyls such as Mastodonsaurus which could reach up to 6 m (20 ft) in length. The study of amphibians is called batrachology, while the study of both reptiles and amphibians is called herpetology. (Full article...)

Where common names are given, they are not the only common names in use for the species.

== Anura ==
Order Anura – frogs and toads

=== Arthroleptidae ===
Family Arthroleptidae

- Genus Arthroleptis:
  - Arthroleptis stenodactylus Pfeffer, 1893, savannah squeaking frog, endemic to Africa
  - Arthroleptis wahlbergii Smith, 1849, bush squeaker, syn. Arthroleptis wageri, endemic
- Genus Leptopelis:
  - Leptopelis bocagi (Günther, 1865), endemic to Africa
  - Leptopelis mossambicus Poynton, 1985, Mozambique tree frog, endemic
  - Leptopelis natalensis (Smith, 1849), Natal tree frog, Hylambates (Leptopelis) natalensis, endemic
  - Leptopelis xenodactylus Poynton, 1963, long-toed tree frog, Leptopelis natalensis (Smith, 1849), endemic

=== Brevicipitidae ===
Family Brevicipitidae

- Genus Breviceps:
  - Breviceps acutirostris Poynton, 1963, strawberry rain frog, endemic
  - Breviceps adspersus Peters, 1882, Transvaal short-headed frog, endemic
  - Breviceps pentheri Werner, 1899, endemic
  - Breviceps bagginsi Minter, 2003, Bilbo's rain frog, endemic
  - Breviceps fuscus Hewitt, 1925, black rain frog, endemic
  - Breviceps gibbosus (Linnaeus, 1758), Cape rain frog, endemic
  - Breviceps macrops Boulenger, 1907, Boulenger's short-headed frog, endemic
  - Breviceps montanus Power, 1926, mountain rain frog, endemic
  - Breviceps mossambicus Peters, 1854, flat-face frog, endemic
  - Breviceps namaquensis Power, 1926, Namaqua rain frog, endemic
  - Breviceps rosei Power, 1926, Rose's rain frog, endemic
    - Breviceps rosei vansoni FitzSimons, 1946, endemic
  - Breviceps sopranus Minter, 2003, whistling rain frog, endemic
  - Breviceps sylvestris FitzSimons, 1930, forest rain frog, endemic
    - Breviceps sylvestris taeniatus Poynton, 1963, endemic
  - Breviceps verrucosus Rapp, 1842, plaintive rain frog, endemic

=== Bufonidae ===
Family Bufonidae

- Genus Amietophrynus:
  - Amietophrynus garmani (Meek, 1897), Garman's toad, syn. Bufo garmani Meek, 1897, endemic to Africa
  - Amietophrynus gutturalis (Power, 1927), guttural toad, syn. Bufo gutturalis Power, 1927, endemic to Africa
  - Amietophrynus maculatus (Hallowell, 1854), flat-backed toad, syn. Bufo maculatus Hallowell, 1854, endemic to Africa
  - Amietophrynus pantherinus (Smith, 1828), western leopard toad, syn. Bufo cruciger Schmidt, 1846, Bufo pantherinus Smith, 1828, endemic
  - Amietophrynus pardalis (Hewitt, 1935), eastern leopard toad, syn. Bufo pardalis Hewitt, 1935, Bufo regularis pardalis Hewitt, 1935, endemic
  - Amietophrynus poweri (Hewitt, 1935), Kimberley toad, syn. Bufo regularis poweri Hewitt, 1935, Bufo poweri Hewitt, 1935, endemic
  - Amietophrynus rangeri (Hewitt, 1935), Kei Road toad, syn. Bufo regularis rangeri Hewitt, 1935, Bufo rangeri Hewitt, 1935, endemic
- Genus Capensibufo:
  - Capensibufo rosei (Hewitt, 1926), Cape mountain toad, syn. Bufo rosei, endemic in South Africa
  - Capensibufo tradouwi (Hewitt, 1926), Tradouw's mountain toad, syn. Bufo tradouwi, endemic
- Genus Poyntonophrynus:
  - Poyntonophrynus fenoulheti (Hewitt & Methuen, 1912), Transvaal dwarf toad, syn. Bufo fenoulheti Hewitt and Methuen, 1912, endemic to Africa
  - Poyntonophrynus vertebralis (Smith, 1848), African dwarf toad, syn. Bufo vertebralis Smith, 1848, endemic
- Genus Schismaderma:
  - Schismaderma carens (Smith, 1848), red toad, syn. Bufo carens, Schismaderma lateralis, endemic
- Genus Vandijkophrynus:
  - Vandijkophrynus amatolicus (Hewitt, 1925), Amatola toad, syn. Bufo amatolicus Hewitt, 1925 |Bufo angusticeps amatolica Hewitt, 1925, endemic
  - Vandijkophrynus angusticeps (Smith, 1848), sand toad, syn. Bufo angusticeps Smith, 1848, endemic
  - Vandijkophrynus gariepensis (Smith, 1848), karroo toad, syn. Bufo gariepensis Smith, 1848, endemic in Southern Africa
  - Vandijkophrynus gariepensis gariepensis (Smith, 1848), endemic
  - Vandijkophrynus gariepensis nubicolus Hewitt, 1927, endemic
  - Vandijkophrynus robinsoni (Branch & Braack, 1996), paradise toad, syn. Bufo robinsoni Branch and Braack, 1996, endemic in Southern Africa

=== Heleophrynidae ===
Family Heleophrynidae

- Genus Hadromophryne:
  - Hadromophryne natalensis (Hewitt, 1913), Natal ghost frog, syn. Heleophryne sylvestris, Heleophryne natalensis Hewitt, 1913, endemic in Southern Africa
- Genus Heleophryne:
  - Heleophryne depressa FritzSimons, 1946, endemic
  - Heleophryne hewitti Boycott, 1988, Hewitt's ghost frog, endemic
  - Heleophryne orientalis FitzSimons, 1946, eastern ghost frog, syn. Heleophryne purcelli orientalis, endemic
  - Heleophryne purcelli Sclater, 1898, Purcell's African ghost frog, syn. Heleophryne purcelli purcelli, endemic
  - Heleophryne regis Hewitt, 1910, southern ghost frog, syn. Heleophryne purcelli regis, endemic
  - Heleophryne rosei Hewitt, 1925, Rose's ghost frog, endemic

=== Hemisotidae ===
Family Hemisotidae

- Genus Hemisus:
  - Hemisus guineensis Cope, 1865, Guinea snout-burrower, syn. Engystoma vermiculatum, Hemisus marmoratum guineensis, endemic
  - Hemisus guttatus (Rapp, 1842), spotted burrowing frog, syn. Engystoma guttatus, endemic
  - Hemisus marmoratus (Peters, 1854), marbled snout-burrower, endemic

=== Hyperoliidae ===
Family Hyperoliidae

- Genus Afrixalus:
  - Afrixalus aureus Pickersgill, 1984, golden spiny reed frog, syn. Afrixalus aureus aureus Pickersgill, 1984, Afrixalus aureus crotalus Pickersgill, 1984, Afrixalus crotalus Pickersgill, 1984, endemic
  - Afrixalus delicatus Pickersgill, 1984, delicate spiny reed frog, endemic
  - Afrixalus fornasini (Bianconi, 1849), Fornasini's spiny reed frog, syn. Afrixalus fornasinii, endemic
  - Afrixalus knysnae (Loveridge, 1954), Knysna spiny reed frog, syn. Hyperolius knysnae, endemic
  - Afrixalus spinifrons (Cope, 1862), Natal spiny reed frog, endemic
- Genus Hyperolius:
  - Hyperolius acuticeps Ahl, 1931, sharp-nosed reed frog, syn. Hyperolius poweri Loveridge, 1938, endemic
  - Hyperolius argus Peters, 1854, yellow spotted reed frog, syn. Rappia argus, endemic
  - Hyperolius horstockii (Schlegel, 1837), Horstock's reed frog, syn. Eucnemis horstokii, Hyla horstockii, Rappia horstockii, endemic
  - Hyperolius marmoratus Rapp, 1842, painted reed frog, endemic
  - Hyperolius nasutus Günther, 1865, long reed frog, endemic
  - Hyperolius pickersgilli Raw, 1982, Pickersgill's reed frog, endemic
  - Hyperolius poweri Loveridge, 1938, Power's reed frog, endemic
  - Hyperolius pusillus (Cope, 1862), water lily reed frog, syn. Crumenifera pusilla, Rappia pusilla, endemic
  - Hyperolius semidiscus Hewitt, 1927, yellow-striped reed frog, endemic
  - Hyperolius tuberilinguis Smith, 1849, tinker reed frog, syn. Hyperolius tuberilinguis, Rappia tuberilinguis, endemic
- Genus Kassina:
  - Kassina maculata (Duméril, 1853), red-legged kassina, syn. Hylambates maculatus, endemic
  - Kassina senegalensis (Duméril & Bibron, 1841), Senegal running frog, endemic
- Genus Semnodactylus:
  - Semnodactylus wealii (Boulenger, 1882), Weale's running frog, syn. Cassina wealii, endemic

=== Microhylidae ===
Family Microhylidae

- Genus Phrynomantis:
  - Phrynomantis annectens Werner, 1910, red-spotted Namibia frog, syn. Phrynomerus annectens, endemic
  - Phrynomantis bifasciatus (Smith, 1847), South African snake-necked frog, syn. Phrynomerus bifasciatus, endemic

=== Phrynobatrachidae ===
Family Phrynobatrachidae

- Genus Phrynobatrachus:
  - Phrynobatrachus acridoides (Cope, 1867), Zanzibar puddle frog, endemic to Africa
  - Phrynobatrachus mababiensis FitzSimons, 1932, Mababe river frog, syn. Phrynobatrachus vanrooyeni, endemic
  - Phrynobatrachus natalensis (Smith, 1849), Natal puddle frog, syn. Stenorhynchus natalensis Smith, 1849, endemic

=== Pipidae ===
Family Pipidae

- Genus Xenopus:
  - Xenopus gilli Rose & Hewitt, 1927, Cape clawed toad, syn. Xenopus laevis gilli, Xenopus gilli Rose and Hewitt, 1927, endemic
  - Xenopus laevis (Daudin, 1802), African clawed frog, syn. Bufo laevis, endemic
  - Xenopus muelleri (Peters, 1844), Muller's clawed frog, syn. Dactylethra muelleri, endemic

=== Ptychadenidae ===
Family Ptychadenidae

- Genus Hildebrandtia:
  - Hildebrandtia ornata (Peters, 1878), ornate frog, endemic
- Genus Ptychadena:
  - Ptychadena anchietae (Bocage, 1868), savannah ridged frog, syn. Rana anchietae Bocage, 1868, endemic to Africa
  - Ptychadena mascareniensis (Duméril & Bibron, 1841), Mascarene ridged frog, syn. Rana mascareniensis, endemic
  - Ptychadena mossambica (Peters, 1854), Mozambique ridged frog, syn. Rana mossambica, endemic
  - Ptychadena oxyrhynchus (Smith, 1849), sharp-nosed ridged frog, syn. Rana oxyrhynchus endemic
  - Ptychadena porosissima (Steindachner, 1867), three-striped grass frog, syn. Rana porosissima, endemic
  - Ptychadena pumilio (Boulenger, 1920), Medine grassland frog, endemic to Africa
  - Ptychadena schillukorum (Werner, 1908), Sudan ridged frog, endemic to Africa
  - Ptychadena taenioscelis Laurent, 1954, small ridged frog, endemic to Africa
  - Ptychadena uzungwensis (Loveridge, 1932), Uzungwe grassland frog, syn. Rana mascareniensis uzungwensis, endemic

=== Pyxicephalidae ===
Family Pyxicephalidae

- Genus Amietia:
  - Amietia angolensis (Bocage, 1866), Angola river frog, syn. Afrana angolensis (Bocage, 1866), syn. Rana angolensis Bocage 1866, endemic to Africa
  - Amietia dracomontana (Channing, 1978), Drakensberg river frog, syn. Afrana dracomontana (Channing, 1978), Rana dracomontana Channing 1978, endemic
  - Amietia fuscigula (Duméril & Bibron, 1841), Cape river frog, syn. Strongylopus hymenopus (Boulenger, 1920), Afrana fuscigula (Duméril and Bibron, 1841), endemic
  - Amietia vandijki (Visser & Channing, 1997), Van Dijk's river frog, syn. Afrana vandijki Visser and Channing, 1997, endemic
  - Amietia vertebralis (Hewitt, 1927), large-mouthed frog, syn. Rana vertebralis, Amietia umbraculata
- Genus Anhydrophryne:
  - Anhydrophryne hewitti (FitzSimons, 1947), Natal chirping frog, syn. Arthroleptella hewitti FitzSimons, 1947, endemic
  - Anhydrophryne rattrayi Hewitt, 1919, Hogsback frog, endemic
- Genus Arthroleptella:
  - Arthroleptella bicolor Hewitt, 1926, Bainskloof moss frog, endemic
  - Arthroleptella ngongoniensis Bishop and Passmore, 1993, mistbelt chirping frog, syn. Arthroleptella ngongoniensis Bishop and Passmore, 1993, endemic
  - Arthroleptella drewesii Channing, Hendricks & Dawood, 1994, Drewes' moss frog, endemic
  - Arthroleptella landdrosia Dawood & Channing, 2000, Landdros moss frog, endemic
  - Arthroleptella lightfooti (Boulenger, 1910), tiny chirping frog, endemic
  - Arthroleptella rugosa Turner & Channing, 2008, introduced
  - Arthroleptella subvoce Turner, de Villiers, Dawood & Channing, 2004
  - Arthroleptella villiersi Hewitt, 1935, De Villiers' moss frog, endemic
- Genus Cacosternum:
  - Cacosternum boettgeri (Boulenger, 1882), Boettger's dainty frog, syn. Arthroleptis boettgeri
  - Cacosternum capense Hewitt, 1925, cross-marked frog, endemic
  - Cacosternum karooicum Boycott, de Villiers & Scott, 2002, Karoo Caco, endemic
  - Cacosternum namaquense Werner, 1910, Namaqua dainty frog, endemic
  - Cacosternum nanum Boulenger, 1887, dwarf dainty frog, endemic
  - Cacosternum nanum Polynton 1963, small dainty frog, endemic
  - Cacosternum platys Rose, 1950, smooth dainty frog, endemic
  - Cacosternum poyntoni Lambiris, 1988, Poynton's caco, endemic
  - Cacosternum striatum FitzSimons, 1947, striped metal frog, endemic
- Genus Microbatrachella:
  - Microbatrachella capensis (Boulenger, 1910), micro frog, syn. Phrynobatrachus capensis, Microbatrachus capensis, endemic
- Genus Natalobatrachus:
  - Natalobatrachus bonebergi Hewitt & Methuen, 1912, Natal diving frog, syn. Phrynobatrachus bonebergi, endemic
- Genus Poyntonia:
  - Poyntonia paludicola Channing & Boycott, 1989, montane marsh frog, endemic
- Genus Pyxicephalus:
  - Pyxicephalus adspersus Tschudi, 1838, South African burrowing frog, near endemic
  - Pyxicephalus edulis Peters, 1854, edible bullfrog, syn. Rana maltzanii, endemic
- Genus Strongylopus:
  - Strongylopus bonaespei (Dubois, 1981), banded stream frog, endemic
  - Strongylopus fasciatus (Smith, 1849), striped stream frog, syn. Rana fasciata, endemic
  - Strongylopus grayii (Smith, 1849), Gray's stream frog, endemic
  - Strongylopus springbokensis Channing, 1986, Namaqua stream frog, endemic
  - Strongylopus wageri (Wager, 1961), Wager's stream frog, syn. Rana wageri, endemic

=== Ranidae ===
Family Ranidae

- Genus Tomopterna:
  - Tomopterna cryptotis (Boulenger, 1907), cryptic sand frog, syn. Rana cryptotis
  - Tomopterna delalandii (Tschudi, 1838), African bullfrog, endemic
  - Tomopterna krugerensis Passmore & Carruthers, 1975, knocking sand frog
  - Tomopterna marmorata (Peters, 1854), marbled sand frog
  - Tomopterna natalensis (Smith, 1849), Natal sand frog, near endemic
  - Tomopterna tandyi Channing & Bogart, 1996, Tandy's sand frog, endemic

=== Rhacophoridae ===
Family Rhacophoridae

- Genus Chiromantis:
  - Chiromantis xerampelina Peters, 1854, grey tree frog, near endemic
