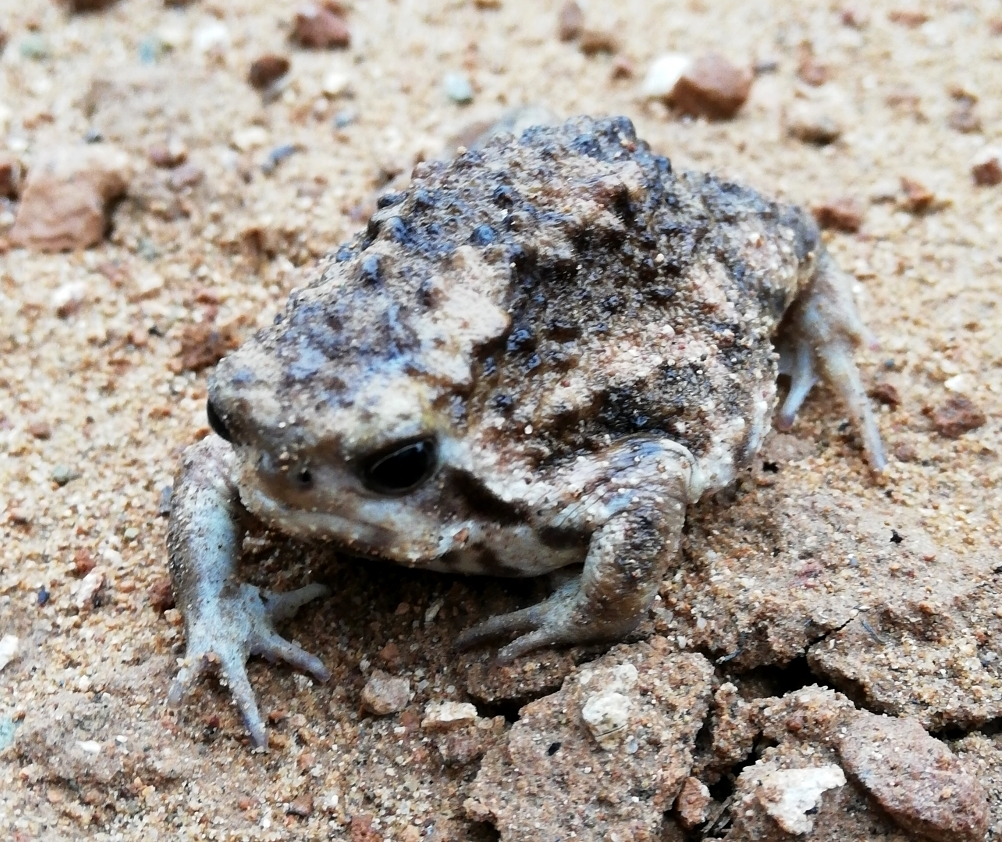

Scientific classification
- Kingdom: Animalia
- Phylum: Chordata
- Class: Amphibia
- Order: Anura
- Family: Brevicipitidae
- Genus: Breviceps
- Species: B. pentheri

Binomial name
- Breviceps pentheri Werner, 1899

= Breviceps pentheri =

Thicket rain frog

Species of frog

Breviceps pentheri, the thicket rain frog, is a species of frog found in South Africa and Eswatini, Mozambique, Botswana, and Namibia.

== Distribution ==
Breviceps pentheri occurs in the northern part of the southern African range. It prefers to dwell near shrubland.

== Classification ==
Breviceps pentheri has in the past been confused with Breviceps adspersus and listed as a synonym or subspecies of Breviceps adspersus but a study found that the frog was more closely related to the whistling rain frog and Bilbo's rain frog than Breviceps adspersus and it is now considered a different species entirely.
