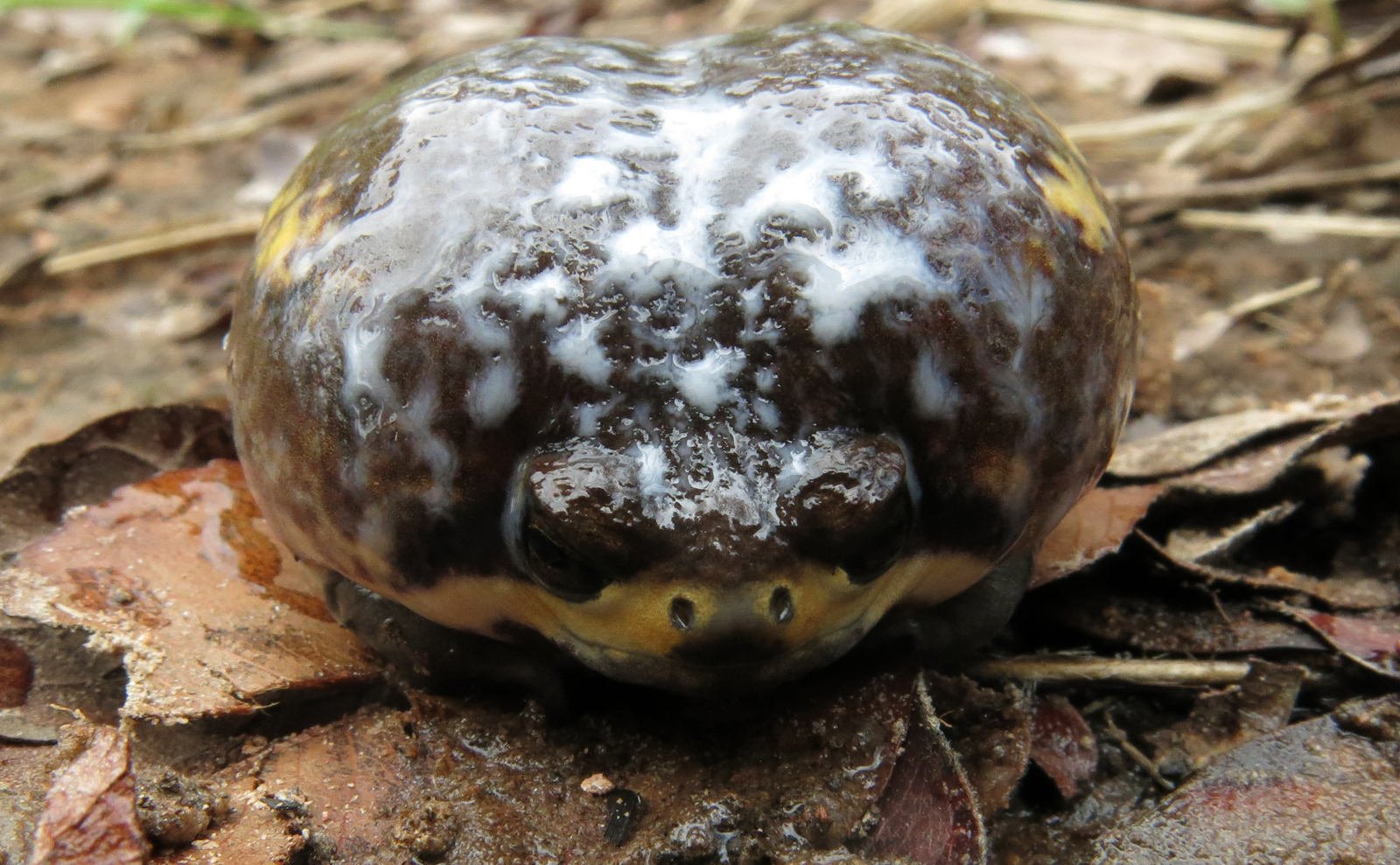

Conservation status
- Least Concern (IUCN 3.1)

Scientific classification
- Kingdom: Animalia
- Phylum: Chordata
- Class: Amphibia
- Order: Anura
- Family: Brevicipitidae
- Genus: Breviceps
- Species: B. poweri

Binomial name
- Breviceps poweri Parker, 1934

= Breviceps poweri =

Species of amphibian

Breviceps poweri, the Power's rain frog or Power's short-headed frog, is a species of frog in the family Brevicipitidae. It is found in northeastern Angola east through Zambia, southern Democratic Republic of the Congo (southern Katanga Province), and Malawi, to western Mozambique and northeastern Zimbabwe; possibly in Namibia. The specific name poweri honours John Hyacinth Power, Irish-born director of the McGregor Museum (Kimberley, South Africa) who collected amphibians as well as reptiles and plants.

== Behaviour ==
Breviceps poweri emerge after rain to feed on ants, termites, and other arthropods; reproduction also occurs during the rainy season. Breviceps poweri males have been observed to start their chorus in the early evening and continue throughout the night. The call is a short, unpulsed whistle, with a slow rise time and a rapid fall time.

== Habitat and conservation ==
Breviceps poweri is a fossorial frog in savanna woodland, shrubland and grassland with sandy soils. Because it breeds by direct development, it is not associated with water. The International Union for Conservation of Nature (IUCN) has assessed it as of "Least Concern": it is locally a very common species that occurs in large areas with little human impact, and is present in many protected areas.
