= Breviceps branchi =

Conservation status
- Data Deficient (IUCN 3.1)

Scientific classification
- Kingdom: Animalia
- Phylum: Chordata
- Class: Amphibia
- Order: Anura
- Family: Brevicipitidae
- Genus: Breviceps
- Species: B. branchi

Binomial name
- Breviceps branchi Channing, 2012

Species of amphibian

Branch's rain frog (Breviceps branchi) is a species of frog in the genus Breviceps, endemic to South Africa.
