= Breviceps ombelanonga =

Scientific classification
- Kingdom: Animalia
- Phylum: Chordata
- Class: Amphibia
- Order: Anura
- Family: Brevicipitidae
- Genus: Breviceps
- Species: B. ombelanonga

Binomial name
- Breviceps ombelanonga Nielsen et al., 2020

Species of frog

Breviceps ombelanonga, the Angolan rain frog, is a species of frog in the family Brevicipitidae, first described in 2020. The frog is endemic to Angola.

== Characteristics ==
Breviceps ombelanonga has a few features which make it distinct from other rain frogs such as lacking a visible tympanum, males having a single, uniformly dark gular patch that is continuous with the mask extending from the eye, having generally smooth dorsal skin, lacking many small tubercles on the palmar surfaces lacking pale spots along flanks and a pale patch above the vent lacking short dark band below nares, lacking confluent inner and outer metatarsal tubercles, having a relatively narrower head, shorter thigh, and shorter manual digit III and having an advertisement call with both a longer interval between consecutive calls and a higher average dominant frequency.

== Etymology ==
The name ombelanonga is a derived combination of two words in Umbundu, a native Angolan language, for rain (ombela) and frog (anonga). The species epithet is used as an invariable noun in apposition to the generic name.
