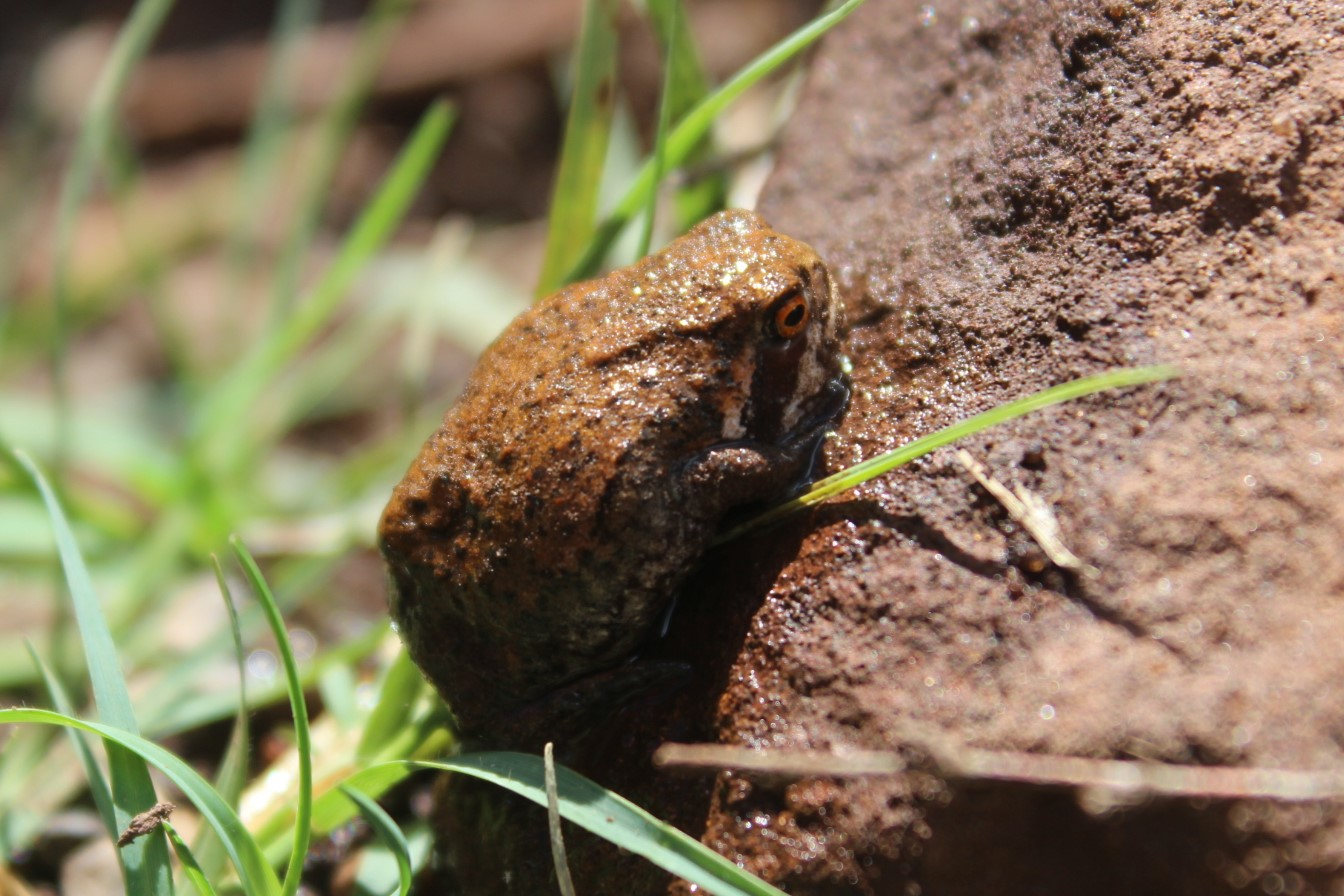

Conservation status
- Least Concern (IUCN 3.1)

Scientific classification
- Kingdom: Animalia
- Phylum: Chordata
- Class: Amphibia
- Order: Anura
- Family: Brevicipitidae
- Genus: Breviceps
- Species: B. mossambicus

Binomial name
- Breviceps mossambicus Peters, 1854

= Mozambique rain frog =

Species of amphibian

The Mozambique rain frog (Breviceps mossambicus), also known as the flat-faced frog, is a species of frog in the family Brevicipitidae. It is found in Botswana, Democratic Republic of the Congo, Eswatini, Malawi, Mozambique, South Africa, Tanzania, Zambia, Zimbabwe, and possibly Lesotho. Its natural habitats are dry savanna, moist savanna, temperate shrubland, subtropical or tropical dry shrubland, temperate grassland, subtropical or tropical dry lowland grassland, subtropical or tropical high-altitude grassland, arable land, pasture land and rural gardens.

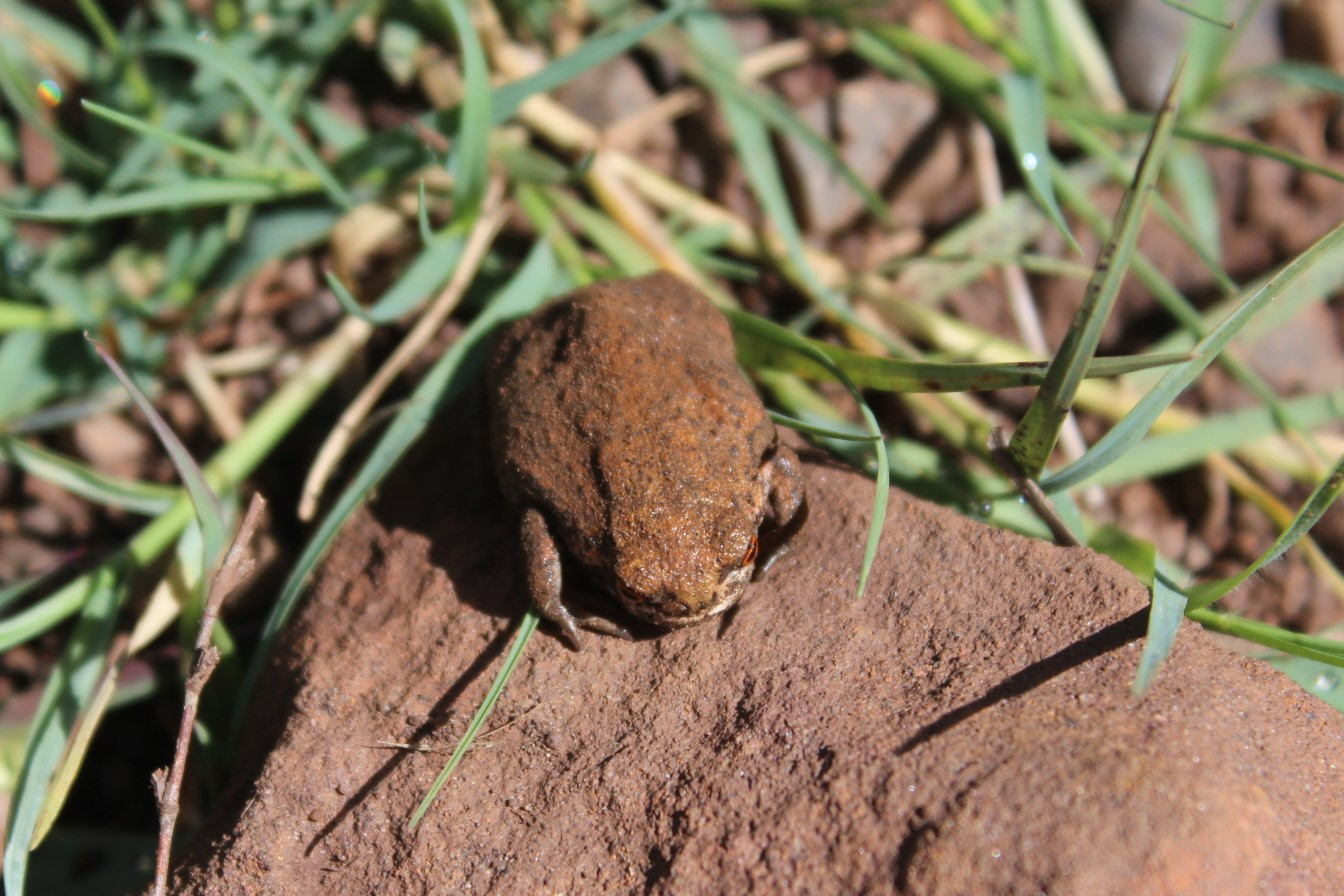
Young Breviceps mossambicus from Mount Sheba, close to Pilgrims Rest in Mpumulanga, South Africa

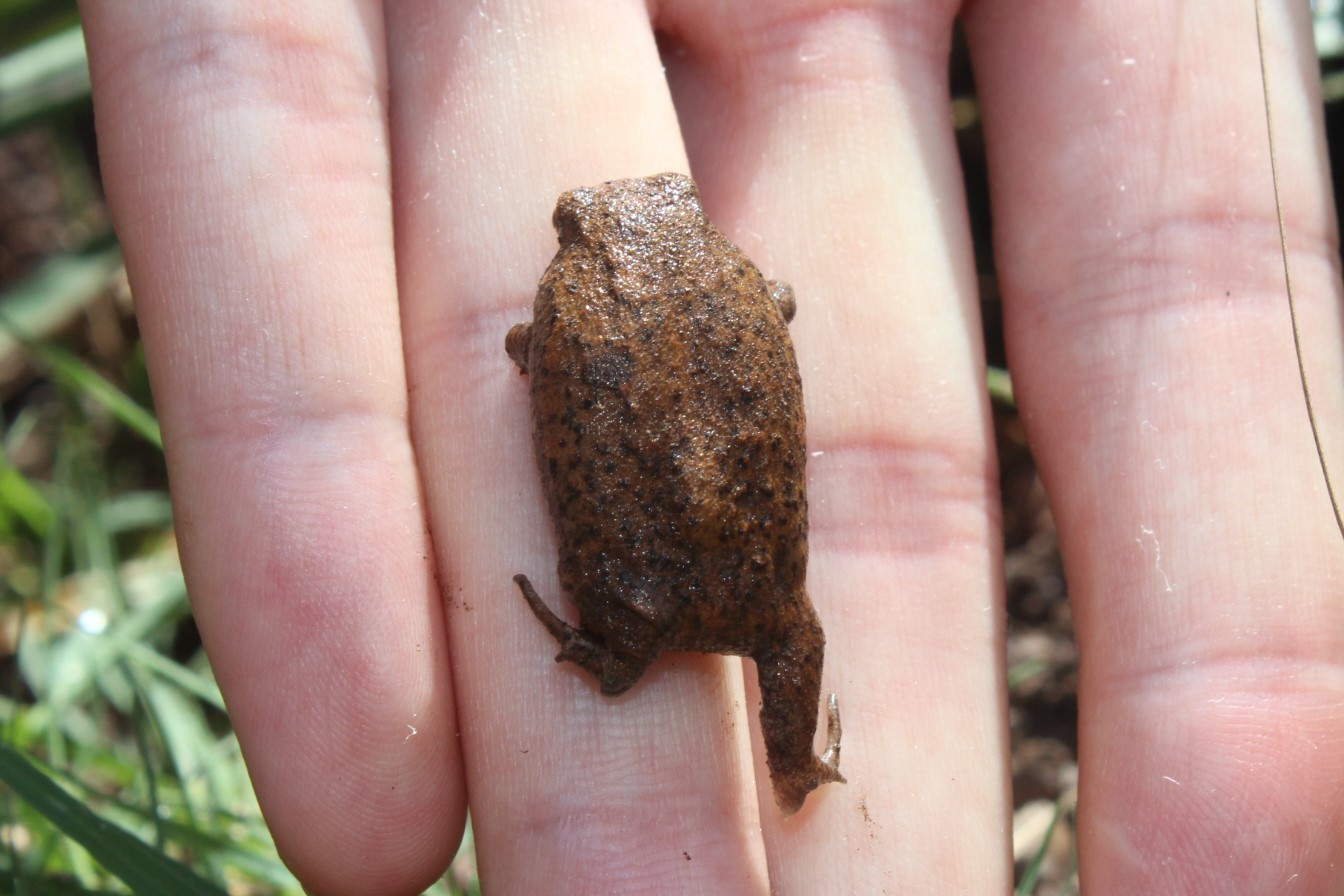

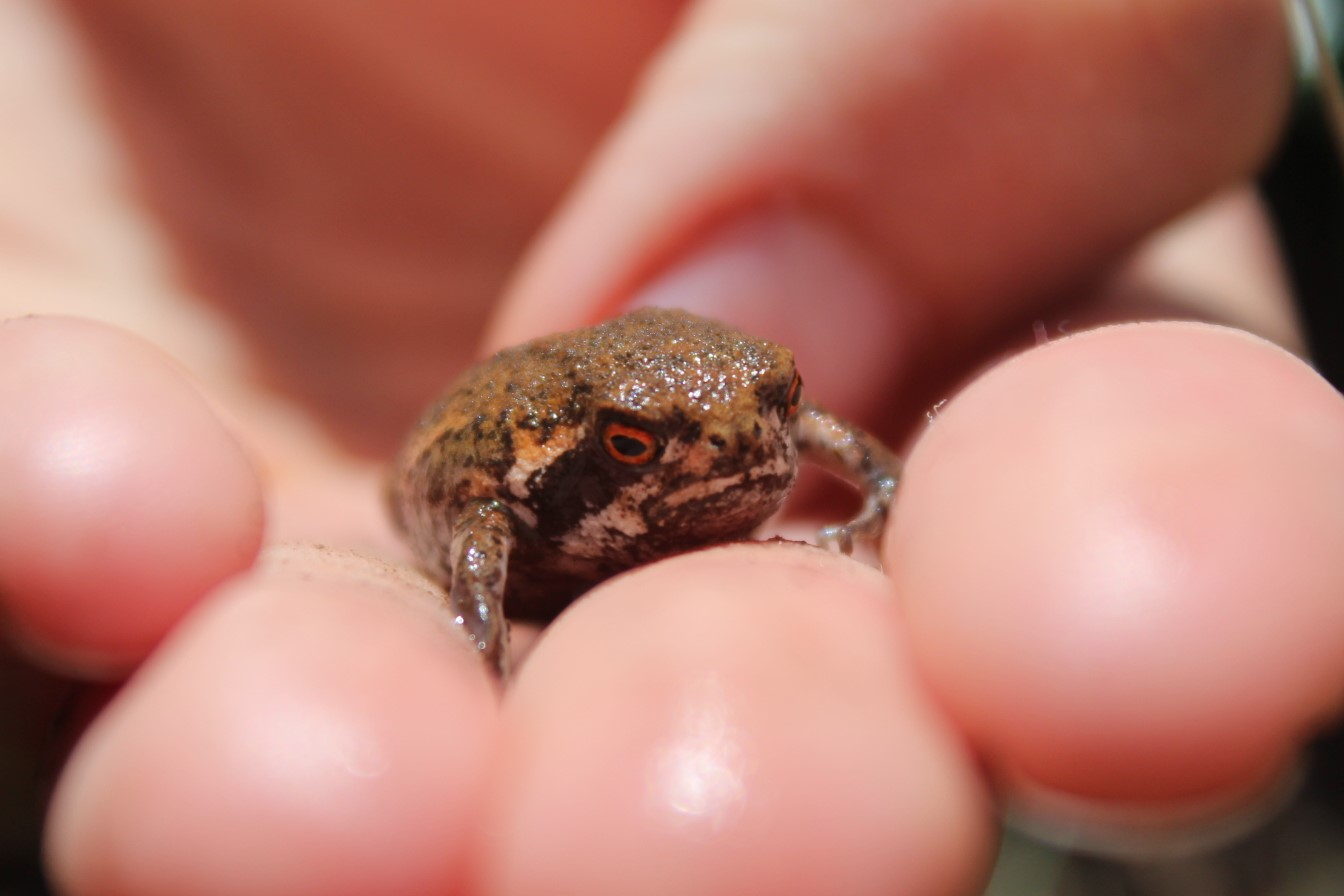

== Description ==
The Mozambique rain frog is a sturdy animal, stout with short legs and a blunt snout. Females grow to a snout-to-vent length of about 52 millimetres (2.0 in). The dorsal surface is greyish-brown speckled with darker colour. A dark streak joins the eye and the front leg, passing over the tympanum. The belly is white with dark blotches and in males, the throat is brown. The feet are unwebbed and the outer two toes are much smaller than the other ones. This species could be confused with Callulina kreffti but that species is more arboreal in habit and has square-ended toepads to assist it in climbing trees. Another frog that is very similar in appearance is Breviceps fichus but the calls of the two species are markedly different.

== Distribution and habitat ==
The Mozambique rain frog has a widespread distribution in southern and central Africa. Its range extends from the Democratic Republic of the Congo and Tanzania in the north to the Republic of South Africa in the south. Its natural habitats are savannah, bushy country and open woodland, especially the moister parts of these. It is found in the lowlands and on the lower slopes in mountainous areas up to a height of 1,800 metres (5,900 ft) above sea level. It is an adaptable species and seems to be able to cope with habitat degradation.

== Biology ==
In dry weather the Mozambique rain frog conceals itself under rocks or in hidden places among tree roots. It feeds on small invertebrates. After substantial rainfall, swarms of winged termites occur and these frogs emerge in large numbers to feed on them.

The Mozambique rain frog lays a small clutch of about twenty-two yolk-rich eggs in a spherical chamber under leaf litter or a grass tussock. Each egg is about 6 millimetres (0.24 in) in diameter and about double this size including the capsule. The embryos take six to eight weeks to develop inside the eggs into young froglets. There is no tadpole stage or need for a body of water in which to reproduce. The female often provides some level of parental care by staying near the clutch but outside the sealed chamber.

== Status ==
The IUCN Red List of Threatened Species lists the Mozambique rain frog as being of "Least Concern". This is because it has a wide range, occurs in a variety of habitats and is able to move to new locations if disturbed in its original habitat.
