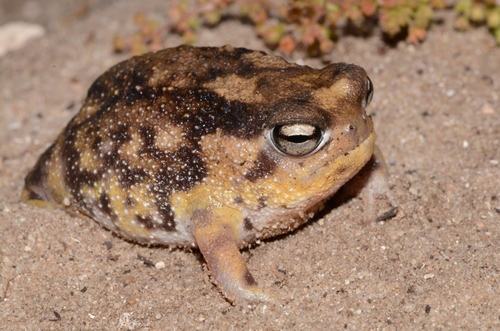

Conservation status
- Least Concern (IUCN 3.1)

Scientific classification
- Kingdom: Animalia
- Phylum: Chordata
- Class: Amphibia
- Order: Anura
- Family: Brevicipitidae
- Genus: Breviceps
- Species: B. namaquensis

Binomial name
- Breviceps namaquensis Power, 1926

= Namaqua rain frog =

Species of amphibian

The Namaqua rain frog or Namaqua short-headed frog (Breviceps namaquensis) is a species of frogs in the family Brevicipitidae. It is found in Namaqualand in western South Africa and extreme southern Namibia.

== Identification ==
Adult frogs attain a body length of 46 mm (1.8 inches).

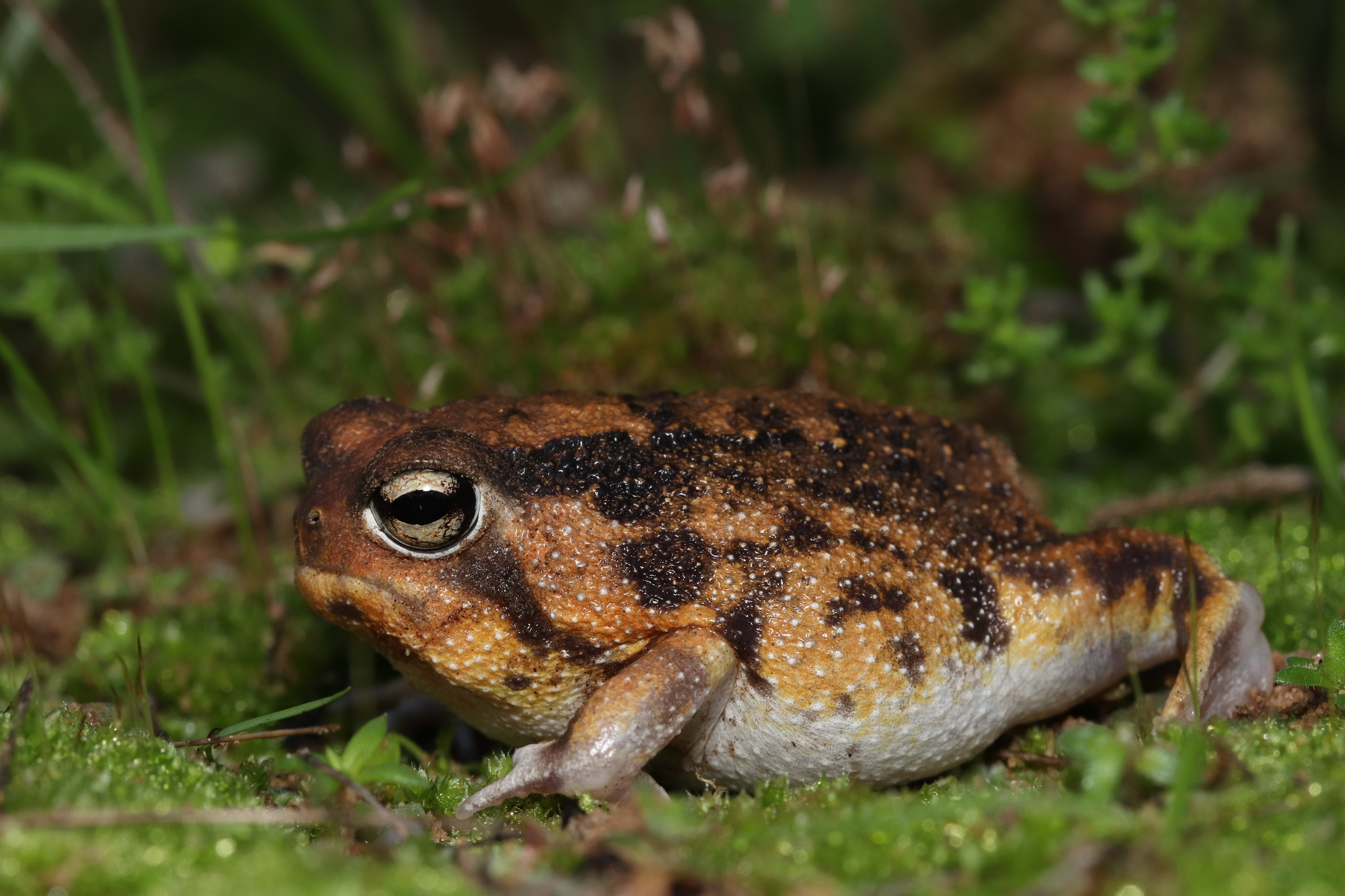
South Africa

The Namaqua rain frog has a squat, round body with a short, narrow head which has relatively large eyes, a flat face and narrow mouth. The limbs are short and stumpy and the fingers and toes lack webbing and adhesive discs. The upper body surface is brown with lighter brown to cream patches on the back and sides. These patches are occasionally fused together and may include irregular pairs of paravertebral patches. The underside is mainly smooth and white, but the skin is translucent in parts, and the throat area may be granular with dark markings around the jaw line. The frog is also almost indistinguishable from the Desert rain frog.

== Behaviour ==
When disturbed, these frogs have the ability to inflate their bodies dramatically and squeak as a defence mechanism to deter predators. Breeding activity has been recorded in winter, spring and summer. They spend most of their time underground, surfacing after the rains to feed on insects. Its eggs are laid in underground chambers and are covered in a thick, viscous, jelly-like substance. Once the eggs hit tadpole stage, the jelly softens into a fluid in which they live until they fully metamorphose into frogs (absorbing nutrients from the egg yolk as they grow).

== Habitat and conservation ==
It is a fossorial frog that inhabits scrub-covered sandy areas in the succulent karoo biome. Development is direct (i.e., there is no free-living larval stage) and does require an aquatic habitat.

It is a locally abundant frog, but it can experience some habitat loss because of agricultural expansion in the south of its range. It is present in several protected areas.
