= B. sylvestris =

B. sylvestris may refer to:

- Bellis sylvestris, the southern daisy, a plant species
- Bombus sylvestris, a bumblebee species
- Breviceps sylvestris, the forest rain frog, a frog species endemic to South Africa
