= Black frog =

Black frog may refer to:

- Black microhylid frog (Melanobatrachus indicus) a frog in the family Microhylidae endemic to the Western Ghats, India
- Black rain frog (Breviceps fuscus), a frog in the family Brevicipitidae endemic to South Africa
- Black torrent frog (Micrixalus saxicola), a frog in the family Micrixalidae endemic to the Western Ghats, India
- Roraima black frog (Oreophrynella quelchii), a frog in the family Bufonidae found in Venezuela, Guyana, and Brazil
