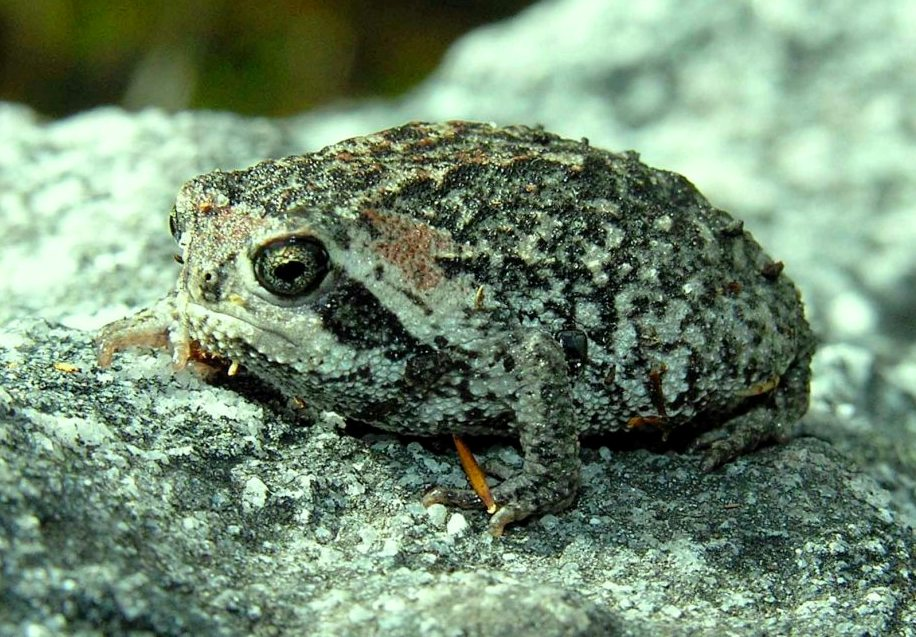

Conservation status
- Least Concern (IUCN 3.1)

Scientific classification
- Kingdom: Animalia
- Phylum: Chordata
- Class: Amphibia
- Order: Anura
- Family: Brevicipitidae
- Genus: Breviceps
- Species: B. montanus

Binomial name
- Breviceps montanus Power, 1926

= Mountain rain frog =

Species of amphibian

The mountain rain frog (Breviceps montanus) is a species of frogs in the family Brevicipitidae.

It is endemic to South Africa.

Its natural habitats are Mediterranean-type shrubby vegetation and plantations. It is threatened by habitat loss.

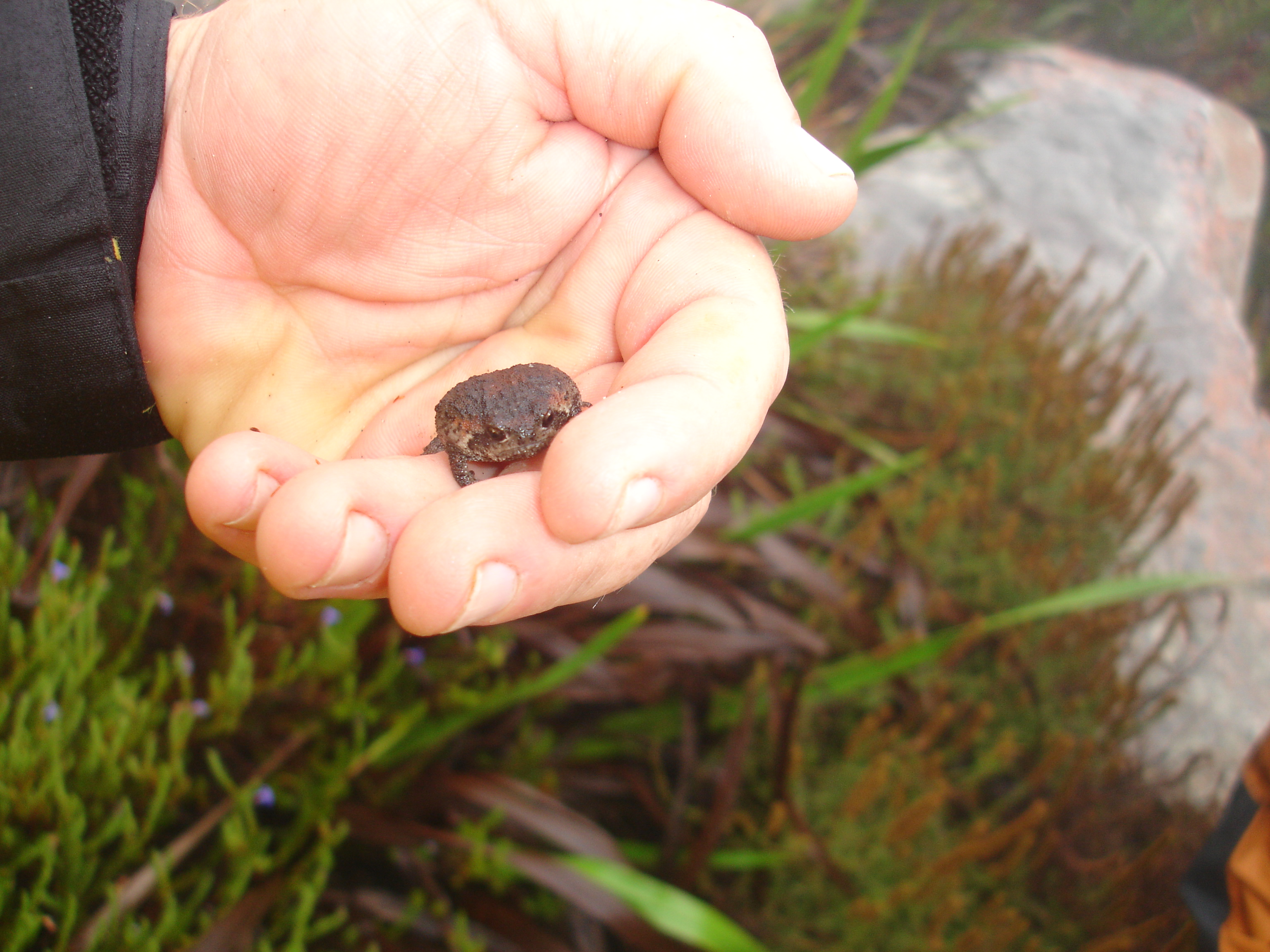
Breviceps montanus
