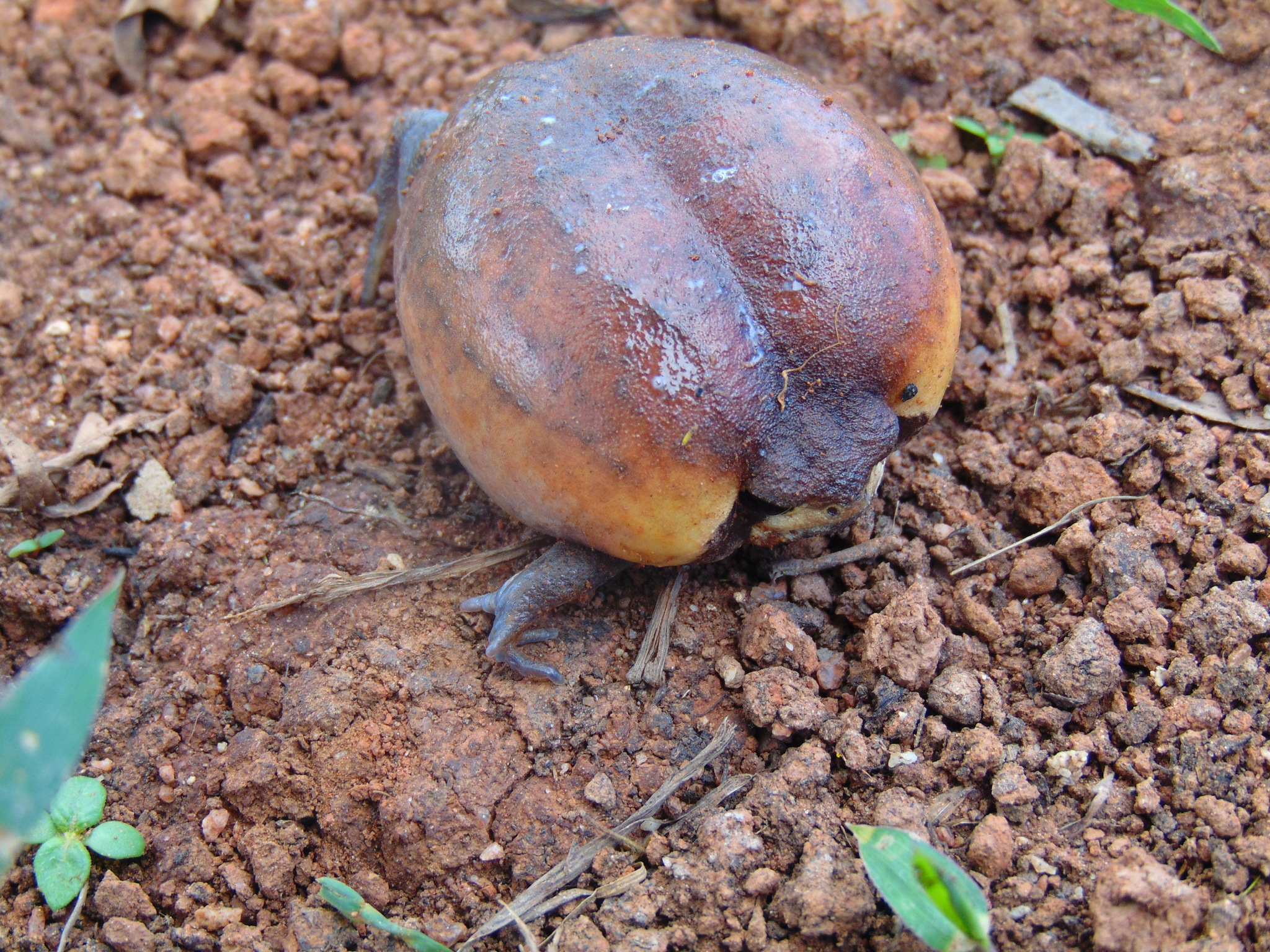

Conservation status
- Least Concern (IUCN 3.1)

Scientific classification
- Kingdom: Animalia
- Phylum: Chordata
- Class: Amphibia
- Order: Anura
- Family: Brevicipitidae
- Genus: Breviceps
- Species: B. fichus

Binomial name
- Breviceps fichus Channing and Minter, 2004

= Breviceps fichus =

Species of frog

Breviceps fichus is a species of frog in the family Brevicipitidae. It is endemic to the central highlands of Tanzania. Common name highland rain frog has been proposed for it.

== Description ==
Males grow to 35 mm (1.4 in) and females to 43 mm (1.7 in) in snout–vent length. The snout is bluntly rounded. The tympanum is not visible. Skin is pitted dorsally and smooth ventrally. The dorsum is brown with darker mottling. Dark bands run from the eyes to the arms. The lower parts are white. Throat is black in breeding males.

The male advertisement call is a brief, low-pitched, pulsed whistle.

== Habitat and conservation ==
Breviceps fichus occurs in high-altitude grasslands at elevations above 1,500 m (4,900 ft). Males call during the day from shallow burrows at the base of dense grass. Development is, presumably, direct (i.e., there is no free-living larval stage). Threats to this species are not known.
