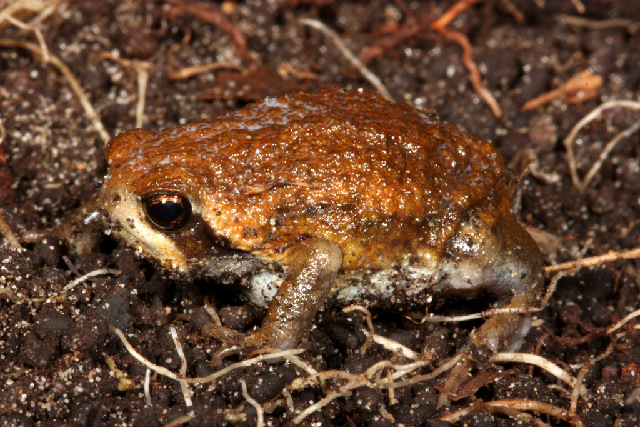

Conservation status
- Near Threatened (IUCN 3.1)

Scientific classification
- Kingdom: Animalia
- Phylum: Chordata
- Class: Amphibia
- Order: Anura
- Family: Brevicipitidae
- Genus: Breviceps
- Species: B. bagginsi

Binomial name
- Breviceps bagginsi Minter, 2003

= Bilbo's rain frog =

Species of amphibian

Bilbo's rain frog (Breviceps bagginsi) is an amphibian species in the family Brevicipitidae, endemic to South Africa. The frog was named after Bilbo Baggins, the main character from The Hobbit by J.R.R Tolkien. The frog was named as such because the scientist who discovered it (L.R Minter) used to read the novel to his children. Its natural habitats are temperate grasslands and edges of wood plantations, wherein it spends most of its time in its burrow. The species is threatened by construction, maintenance of roads, silviculture, general habitat degradation/habitat loss, and by road traffic. As a result, it is listed as Near Threatened in the IUCN Red List of Threatened Species.

== Description ==
Breviceps bagginsi is a microhylid (narrow-mouthed) frog from the family of Brevicipitidae and was discovered in the year 2003. Males range from 20 to 25.9 mm in length, and females measure around 28.7 mm, approximately the diameter of a U.S. quarter. With its highly truncated snout it is well adapted to its burrowing lifestyle. They have a characteristic tympanic membrane and their pupil is horizontally ecliptic. Unlike other frogs, Breviceps males have very short limbs relative to their body size.

The dorsum of Breviceps bagginsi is a medium to dark brown and it has fairly granular skin texture with darkly pigmented tubercles, each containing openings of 2-6 dermal glands. The ventrum (underside) is white with subtle flecks, transitioning to more prominent darker mottling in the throat region. The texture varies from lightly granular to completely smooth. Breviceps bagginsi has a black stripe running from its eye to the origin of its arm. They have a lighter bar between the eyes and a white stripe from their lower eyelid to their mouth. The sides of its body are brown with a few white speckles. The outer toe length is equal to its width and lacks webbing, making it distinguished from other Brevicipitidae.

As a member of the genus Breviceps, Breviceps bagginsi shows sexual dimorphism, and the males are much smaller than the females. The males can also be categorized through their darker tones on their throats compared to their female counterparts.

As all species from Brevicipitidae, Breviceps bagginsi lack sphenethmoids, and a middle ear. Sphenethmoids are the bone of the skull surrounding the anterior end of an amphibian's brain.

Some of the research done to trace back the lineage for Breviceps bagginsi has been labeled cf. to represent the uncertainty of identification to distinguish it from Breviceps Sopranus.

== Distribution, habitat and ecology ==
Breviceps bagginsi only occur in South Africa. They live on edges of wood plantations in Kwazulu-Natal midlands of southeastern South Africa along the mist belt from Boston in the west to Melmoth in the north-east and down to the coast at Mkambati. They occur in an elevation range of 25–1400 m ASL (meters above sea level).

A collection of specimens gathered in Silaka, NR and one other PEM collected about 15 km away from Mkambati, NR have been given the momentary identification of Breviceps bagginsi. This discovery leads to the possibility that the species' distribution is expanding southward, potentially reaching the Port St Johns area.

The Mkambati area is protected due to its biodiversity and therefore high conservation value. The Breviceps bagginsi population in this area lives in undisturbed grasslands.

Currently, their overall presence remains steady but the area they inhabit is decreasing. Their populations are heavily fragmented, and their habitat quality is declining due to forestry operations and road construction and maintenance.

== Behavior ==
=== Sexual behavior and lifespan ===
Their mating call has two call bouts sang in a succession of seven to nine whistles in a rapid motion, both at a frequency of 2552 Hz. Males produce their mating call while underneath vegetation and from visible areas on the surface. Due to the frog's sensitivity to dry heat, mating calls last longer during cooler wetter weather.

Because of their mentioned sexual dimorphism and short limbs, they are not able to amplex the females during the process of mating, but with an adhesive secretion they can adhere to the body of the female. While the male remains adhered to the female, she carries him on her back until the pair can find a place to burrow, and the female then lays her clutch of 20-50 eggs in their nest.

Breeding occurs in subterranean nests during spring and summer. Offspring hatch fully developed from eggs directly. Offspring also develop further in the burrows, as rain frogs do not have a free-swimming tadpole stage, and emerge from them once fully mature.

Similar to the other members of Breviceps, Bilbo's rain frog has a life span ranging from 4 to 15 years.

=== Burrowing/locomotive behavior and defense behavior ===
Much like the other members of Breviceps, Breviceps bagginsi burrows in subterranean nests underneath the clay loam their habitats usually harbor. The frog stays in the burrow until it is wet enough on the surface for it to come out. Breviceps bagginsi's hind legs and feet are strong and highly adapted for burrowing. When burrowing, the frog buries itself backwards rapidly. Bilbo's rain frog also runs rather than jumping (as do the other members of Breviceps).

When threatened, Breviceps "puff up" to appear larger and more threatening, they do this by inflating their lungs. Breviceps also secrete a sticky white substance from their skin, and sometimes emit a harsh shriek as a defense mechanism.

=== Feeding behavior and diet ===
Breviceps bagginsi is both a terrestrial and fossorial amphibian, and therefore it spends a great deal of time in its burrow, but once termites emerge they leave their nests to feed. Breviceps bagginsi is an insectivore, and they also feed upon ants, beetles, moths, woodlice, amphipods, juvenile millipedes, caterpillars, and other small arthropods.

== Status ==
On the IUCN Red List of Threatened Species Breviceps bagginsi was listed as data deficient until 2010. In 2017 it was relisted as Near Threatened because of the small area of occurrence (11'000 km^{2}) and the declining area of occupancy, which is only 10% of the occurrence (1'100 km^{2}). Although their occupancy is declining, their occurrence remains the same. Furthermore, Breviceps bagginsi live in extremely fragmented subpopulations and the quality of their habitat is decreasing due to sylviculture and construction and maintenance of roads.

Subpopulation sizes are around 20-30 individuals. Distances between subpopulations are too long to allow dissemination within one generation.
