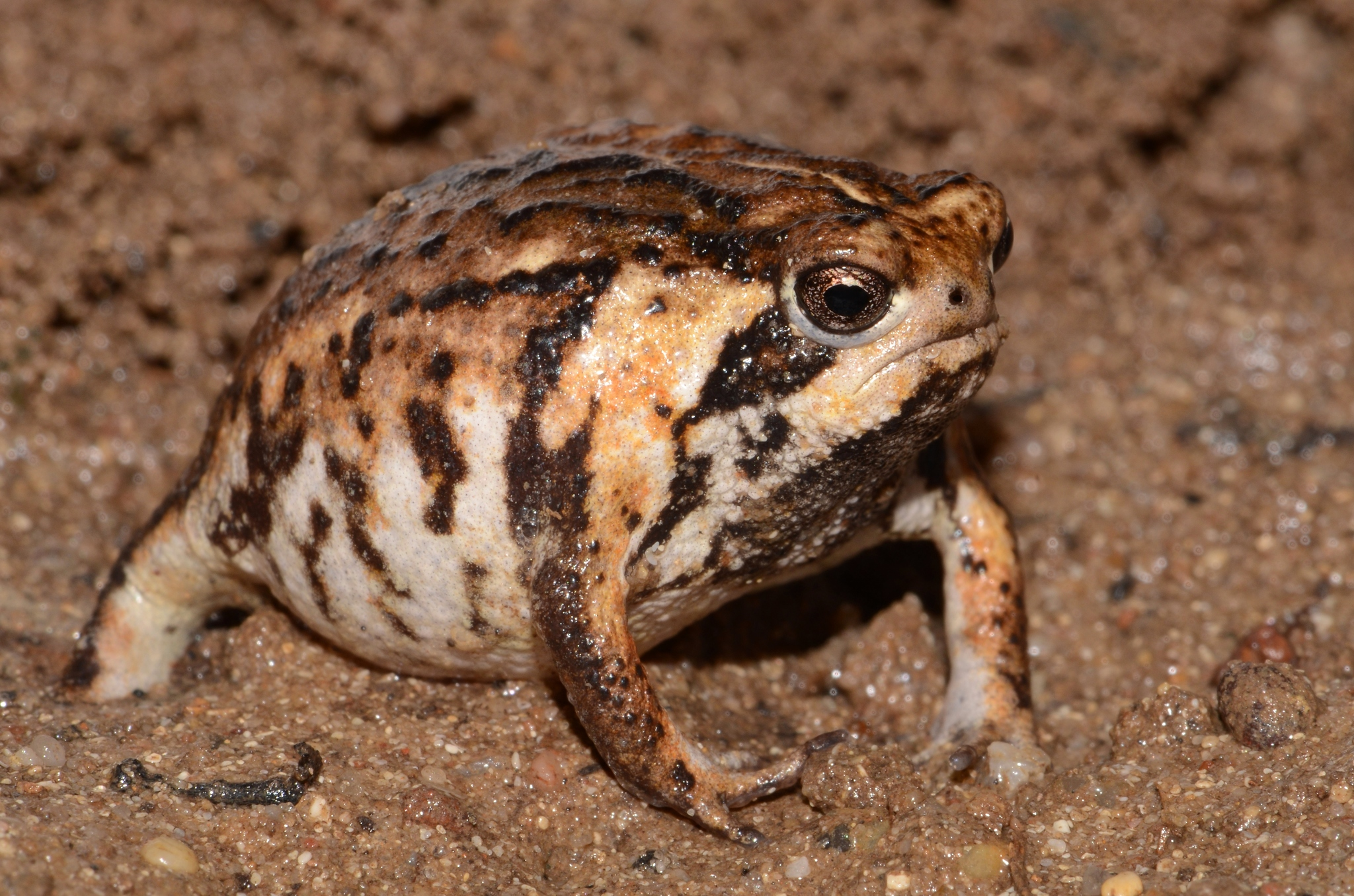
- B. rosei ssp. rosei

Conservation status
- Least Concern (IUCN 3.1)

Scientific classification
- Kingdom: Animalia
- Phylum: Chordata
- Class: Amphibia
- Order: Anura
- Family: Brevicipitidae
- Genus: Breviceps
- Species: B. rosei

Binomial name
- Breviceps rosei Power, 1926
- Sand rain frog (Breviceps rosei rosei) Eastern Rose rain frog (Breviceps rosei vansoni)

= Rose's rain frog =

Species of amphibian endemic to the Western Cape, South Africa

Rose's rain frog or Rose's rainfrog (Breviceps rosei) is a species of frog in the family Brevicipitidae. It is endemic to the sandveld of south-western coastal South Africa. It is less-frequently known as Rose's short-headed frog, Rose's Blaasop, or the sand rain frog. Some treat Breviceps fasciatus as a synonym of this species, although other authorities have expressed doubt.

Frogs in this species spend most of their lives in subterranean nests under sandy ground, where they lay their eggs. They surface during heavy rain. They cannot swim, and are not found in water. Tadpoles develop inside the eggs and hatch as fully formed baby frogs.

== Habitats ==
Its natural habitats are temperate shrubland, Fynbos Mediterranean shrubland vegetation, sandy shores, arable land, pastureland, rural gardens, and urban areas. It is threatened by habitat loss, and its range is restricted to less than 20,000 square kilometers. Despite this, its future seems secure, as it is very adaptable and remains locally abundant.

== Subspecies ==
There are two subspecies found on separate coasts. The sand rain frog (Breviceps rosei rosei) occurs on the west coast of the Western Cape, and on Robben Island. The eastern Rose rain frog (Breviceps rosei vansoni) occurs on the south coast of the Western Cape.
