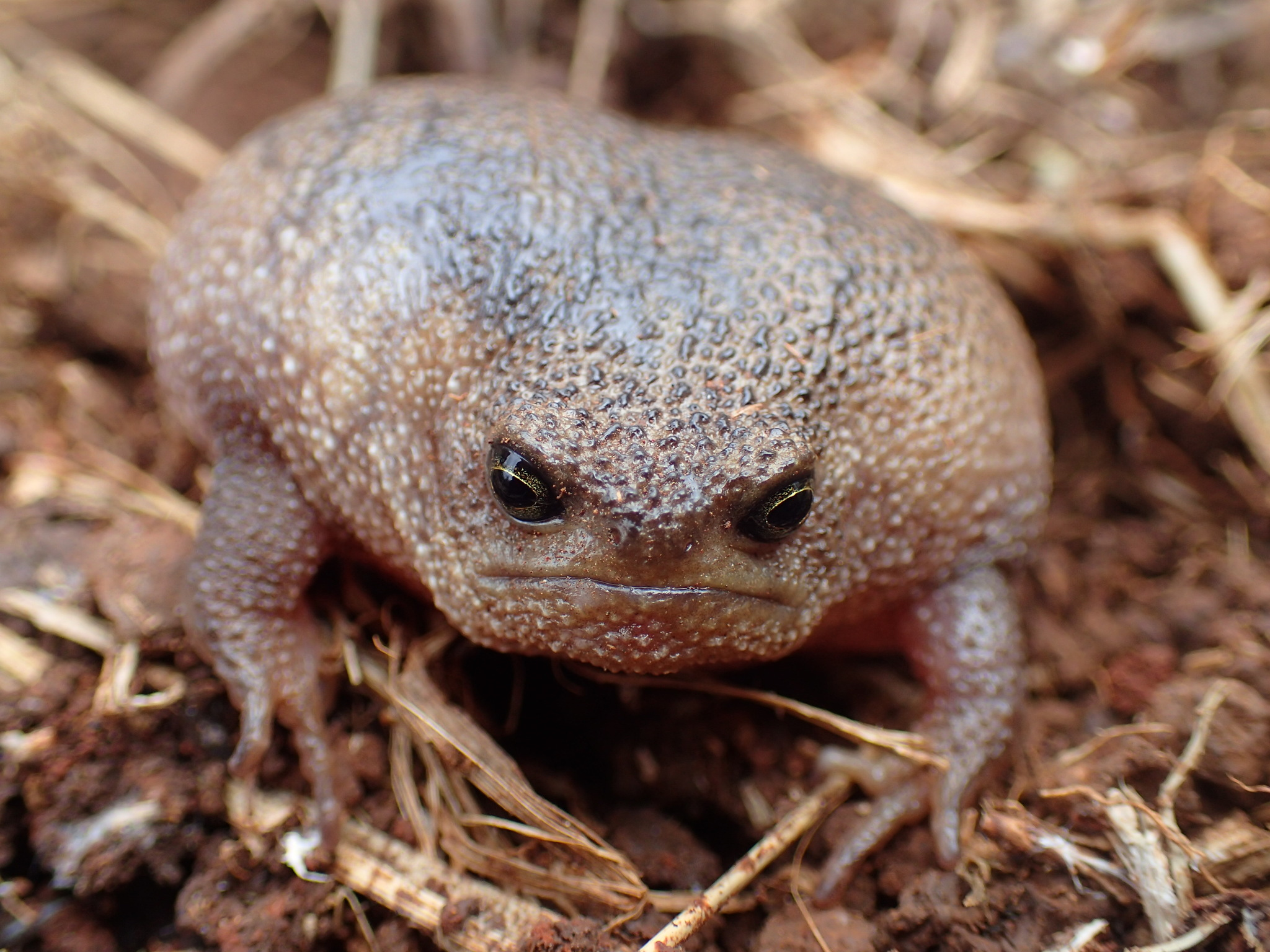

Conservation status
- Least Concern (IUCN 3.1)

Scientific classification
- Kingdom: Animalia
- Phylum: Chordata
- Class: Amphibia
- Order: Anura
- Family: Brevicipitidae
- Genus: Breviceps
- Species: B. verrucosus

Binomial name
- Breviceps verrucosus Rapp, 1842

Synonyms
- Breviceps maculatus FitzSimons, 1947

= Plaintive rain frog =

Species of amphibian

The plaintive rain frog or rough rain frog (Breviceps verrucosus) is a species of frog in the family Brevicipitidae. It is found in Lesotho, South Africa, and Eswatini. Its natural habitats are temperate forests, dry savanna, temperate shrubland, temperate grassland, and rural gardens. It is threatened by habitat loss.
