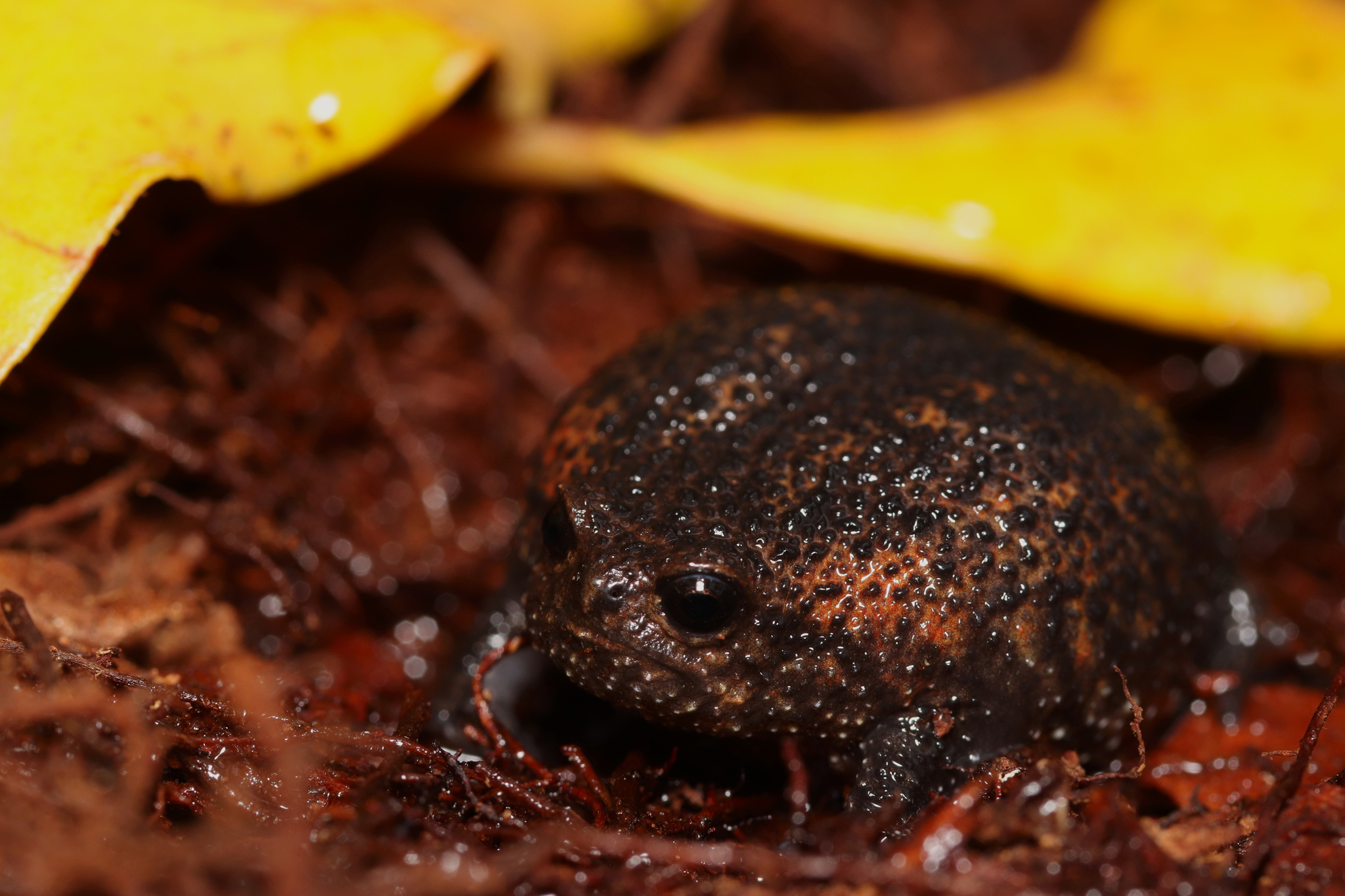

Conservation status
- Least Concern (IUCN 3.1)

Scientific classification
- Kingdom: Animalia
- Phylum: Chordata
- Class: Amphibia
- Order: Anura
- Family: Brevicipitidae
- Genus: Breviceps
- Species: B. acutirostris

Binomial name
- Breviceps acutirostris Poynton, 1963

= Breviceps acutirostris =

Species of amphibian

Breviceps acutirostris, also known as common rain frog, strawberry rain frog, or Cape short-headed frog, is a species of frog in the family Brevicipitidae. It is endemic to the southwestern Cape region in South Africa. It is a burrowing frog that lives in fynbos heatland and forests at elevations below 1,600 m (5,200 ft) above sea level. Development is direct (i.e., there is no free-living larval stage). It is threatened by habitat loss, although much of its habitat is also protected.
