= Spelaeophryne =

Conservation status
- Least Concern (IUCN 3.1)

Scientific classification
- Kingdom: Animalia
- Phylum: Chordata
- Class: Amphibia
- Order: Anura
- Family: Brevicipitidae
- Genus: Spelaeophryne; Ahl, 1924
- Species: S. methneri

Binomial name
- Spelaeophryne methneri Ahl, 1924

Genus of amphibians

Spelaeophryne methneri is a species of frog in the family Brevicipitidae. It is the only species in the monotypic genus Spelaeophryne. It is found in Tanzania and possibly Malawi. Its natural habitats are subtropical or tropical moist lowland forest, subtropical or tropical moist montane forest, and moist savanna.
