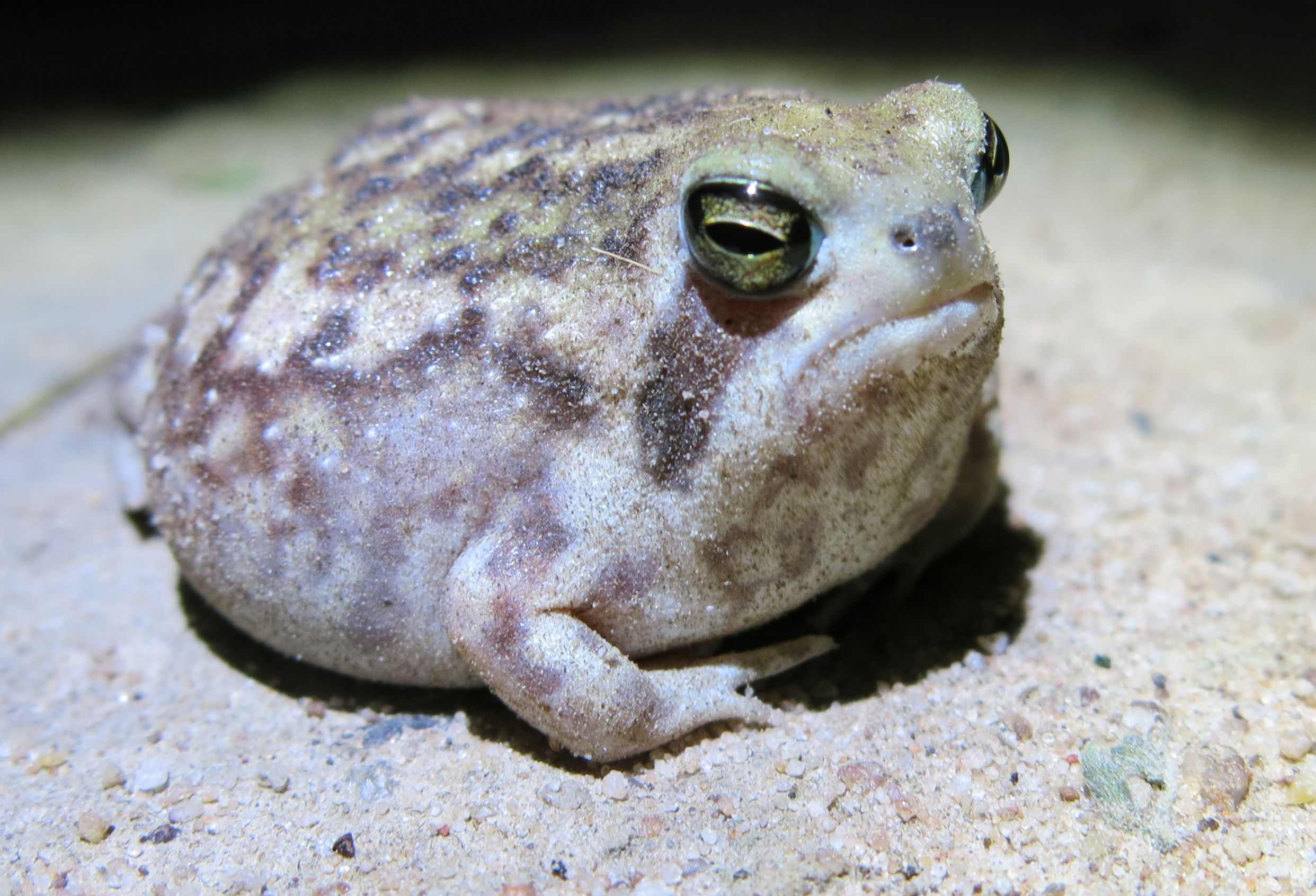
- Breviceps adspersus, Limpopo, South Africa.

Conservation status
- Least Concern (IUCN 3.1)

Scientific classification
- Kingdom: Animalia
- Phylum: Chordata
- Class: Amphibia
- Order: Anura
- Family: Brevicipitidae
- Genus: Breviceps
- Species: B. adspersus

Binomial name
- Breviceps adspersus Peters, 1882

Synonyms
- Breviceps mossambicus var. occidentalis Werner, 1903; Breviceps pretoriensis FitzSimons, 1930

= Breviceps adspersus =

Common Rain Frog

Species of amphibian

Breviceps adspersus, also known as common rain frog, bushveld rain frog, and many other vernacular names, is a species of frog in the family Brevicipitidae. It is found in Southern Africa, in Angola, Democratic Republic of the Congo, Namibia, Botswana, Zambia, Zimbabwe, South Africa, Eswatini, and Mozambique.

== Description ==
The common rain frog is brownish-green and has a round body and stumpy legs. It cannot jump or swim. It has sharply rigid metatarsal tubercles that are used to dig deep burrows. The species has significant sexual dimorphism. Males are 30–47 mm in length, while females are usually larger, at 40–60 mm. There are two types of common rain frog, Breviceps adspersus adspersus and Breviceps adspersus pentheri of which B. adspersus is found mostly in southeast Africa and B. pentheri in the southern regions of Africa. It is difficult to assert that the two are a subspecies; however, they are still distinguished as such because of differences in colouration and markings.

== Behavior and Ecology ==
The common rain frog inhabits temperate forests and open grasslands of Southeast Africa. They spend the dry winter months in burrows and emerge after rain to feed and mate, usually at night. Their diet consists of termites, ants, and other invertebrates. The population of this species is stable, and listed as "locally common".

== Reproduction ==
Since males are too small to grip the female during mating as other frogs do, the male secretes a kind of glue to keep the mating pair together. The stuck-together pair burrow backwards into the soil until they reach the chamber the female has dug 12 in (30 cm) below the soil surface. There the female lays her eggs. The eggs hatch directly into froglets instead of tadpoles.
