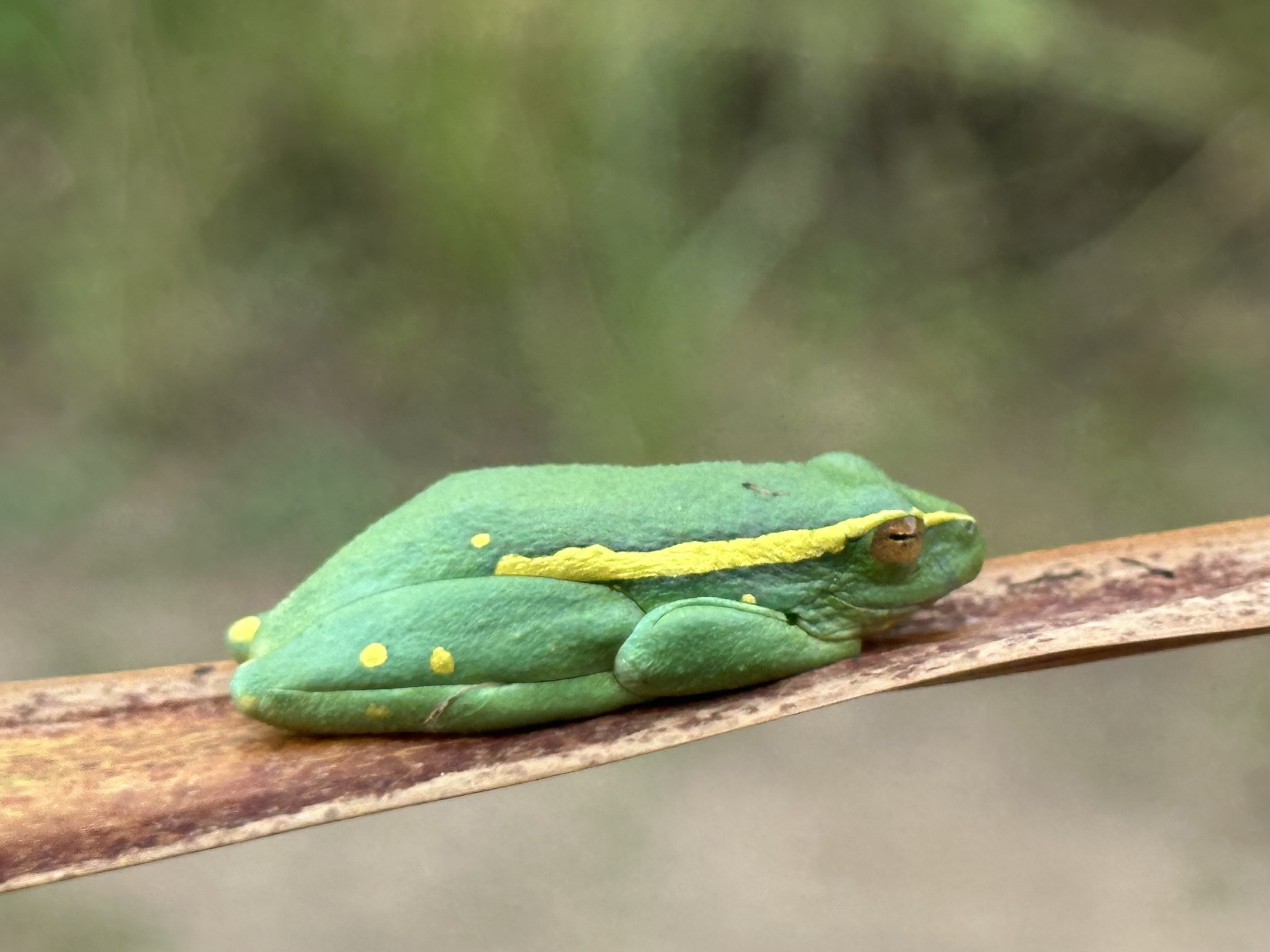

Conservation status
- Least Concern (IUCN 3.1)

Scientific classification
- Kingdom: Animalia
- Phylum: Chordata
- Class: Amphibia
- Order: Anura
- Family: Hyperoliidae
- Genus: Hyperolius
- Species: H. semidiscus

Binomial name
- Hyperolius semidiscus Hewitt, 1927

Synonyms
- Hyperolius horstockii semidiscus Hewitt, 1927

= Hyperolius semidiscus =

Species of amphibian

Hyperolius semidiscus is a species of frogs in the family Hyperoliidae. It is found in southern and eastern South Africa and in Eswatini, and it is likely to be present in Mozambique. Common names yellow-striped reed frog, yellow-flanked reed frog, and Hewitt's reed frog have been coined for it.

== Description ==
Hyperolius semidiscus can grow to 35 mm (1.4 in) in snout–vent length. The dorsum is green or brown. Yellow canthal–dorsolateral lines with well-defined edges are typically present; often, they have a thin black outline. The hidden surfaces of limbs are yellow or orange, as are the digits and the inter-digital webbing. The venter is cream or yellow. Males have a dark yellow gular flap. The pupil is horizontal.

The tadpoles are up to 48 mm (1.9 in) in length.

The male advertisement call is a harsh "creak", with occasional longer, pulsatile "croaks".

== Habitat and conservation ==
Hyperolius semidiscus inhabits savanna and thickets typically at low elevations, but occasionally even higher 1,000 m (3,300 ft). It is usually found in dense reeds and emergent vegetation along rivers and pans. Breeding takes place in semi-permanent water. It is an uncommon species that is locally adversely affected by afforestation, agriculture, and urban spread. However, it might be benefiting from the spread of the invasive water hyacinth that creates suitable breeding habitat. It is present in a number of protected areas.
