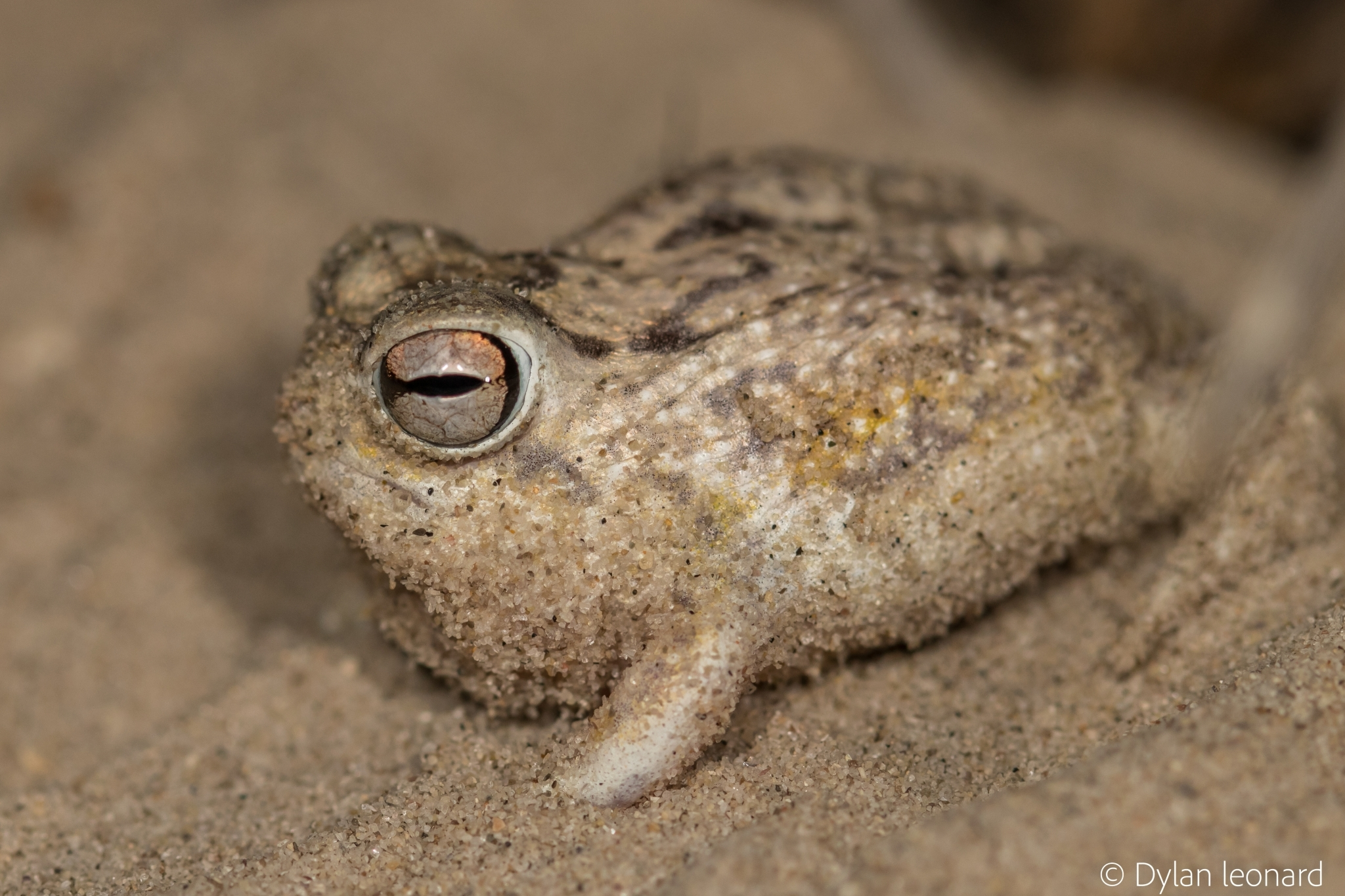

Conservation status
- Vulnerable (IUCN 3.1)

- Vulnerable (SANBI Red List)

Scientific classification
- Kingdom: Animalia
- Phylum: Chordata
- Class: Amphibia
- Order: Anura
- Family: Brevicipitidae
- Genus: Breviceps
- Species: B. macrops

Binomial name
- Breviceps macrops Boulenger, 1907

= Desert rain frog =

Species of amphibian

The desert rain frog, web-footed rain frog, or Boulenger's short-headed frog (Breviceps macrops) is a species of frog in the family Brevicipitidae. It is found in Namibia and South Africa. Its natural habitat is the narrow strip of sandy shore between the sea and the sand dunes. This habitat is characterised by loose sand and continuous strong winds, with approximately 60 millimetres (2.4 in) of annual precipitation and no surface water. The species is threatened with habitat loss by such factors as mining and tourism. Estimates in 2011 suggested that there are fewer than 10,000 individuals, and with its reduction of habitat it is considered to be vulnerable.

== Description ==
The desert rain frog is a plump species with bulging eyes, a short snout, short limbs, spade-like feet, and webbed toes. On the underside, it has a translucent area of skin through which its internal organs can be seen. It can be between 4 and 6 centimetres (1.6 and 2.4 in) long. Its color is yellowish-brown, and sand often adheres to its skin. Sand sticks to the frog's entire body, excluding the mouth and nose, and this can likely be attributed to a type of sticky secretion, as removal of sand from the frog is difficult.

Unlike most other species of frogs, it develops directly from the egg into adults without passing through the tadpole stage. It has a stout body with small legs, which makes it unable to hop or leap, so it walks around on the sand. Unusually for a frog, it does not require water in its habitat to survive, but it does not have any apparent adaptation to prevent water loss. Its eyes are comparatively large and bulging. The lifespan ranges between 4 and 14 years.

== Habitat ==
The desert rain frog is mostly found on a small strip of land about 10 kilometres (6.2 mi) wide along the coast of Namibia and South Africa below the Congo basin. This area is characterized by sandy shores and dunes, the climate in the region is usually dry and arid, with very little rainfall. However, the small strip of land where the frogs live gets an unusual amount of fog for the region, which supplies them with enough moisture to survive. They also burrow underground to wait out dry periods. Small amounts of rainfall does occur in the southern hemisphere winter months of June and July.

The desert rain frog's habitat is characterized by xerophytic vegetation, which is also adapted to living in dry environments, and in the spring, the area blooms with a variety of flowering plants.

== Reproduction ==
During the breeding season, which occurs between June and October, male desert rain frogs emerge from their burrows at night and call out to females using a distinctive squeaking sound. When a female hears a male's call and is interested in mating, she will approach him and the two will mate underground. After mating, the female will lay a clutch of eggs, which can range in size from 12 to 40 eggs. Desert rain frogs are terrestrial breeders meaning that the eggs develop in a burrow and one of the adult frogs remains in the area of the nest. The eggs hatch into froglets, which do not go through a free-living tadpole stage like many other frog species. Instead, the froglets emerge fully formed from the eggs and are able to move and hunt for insects on their own.

== Behavior ==
The desert rain frog is nocturnal, spending the day in a burrow which is dug to a depth of 10 to 20 centimetres (3.9 to 7.9 in) where the sand is moist. It emerges on both foggy and clear nights and wanders about over the surface of the dunes. Its footprints are distinctive and are often found around patches of dung where it is presumed to feed on moths, beetles, and insect larvae. It is also known to eat beetles and ants. It digs its way into the sand in the morning and its presence in a locality can be deduced from the little pile of loose sand dislodged by its burrowing activities. Breeding is by direct development of eggs laid in its burrow, there is no aquatic tadpole stage. It produces a high-pitched squeaking sound when threatened. The male's croaking is also distinctly high-pitched.

They are docile when interacting with researchers. The overlap of movement between them suggests that they are territorial with others of the same species.

== Status ==
The frog's total habitat range is smaller than 2,000 square kilometres (770 sq mi) and is fragmented. The number of individual frogs was previously decreasing but it is now unknown whether the population is decreasing or not. It is threatened by habitat loss caused by opencast diamond mining and road construction, as well as increased human settlement. Fortunately, opencast diamond mining has recently ceased in south Africa. Attempts to restore the frogs' habitat by mining companies could mean that the frog is no longer threatened. However, no evidence has indicated that the frogs have actually recolonized their restored habitat.
