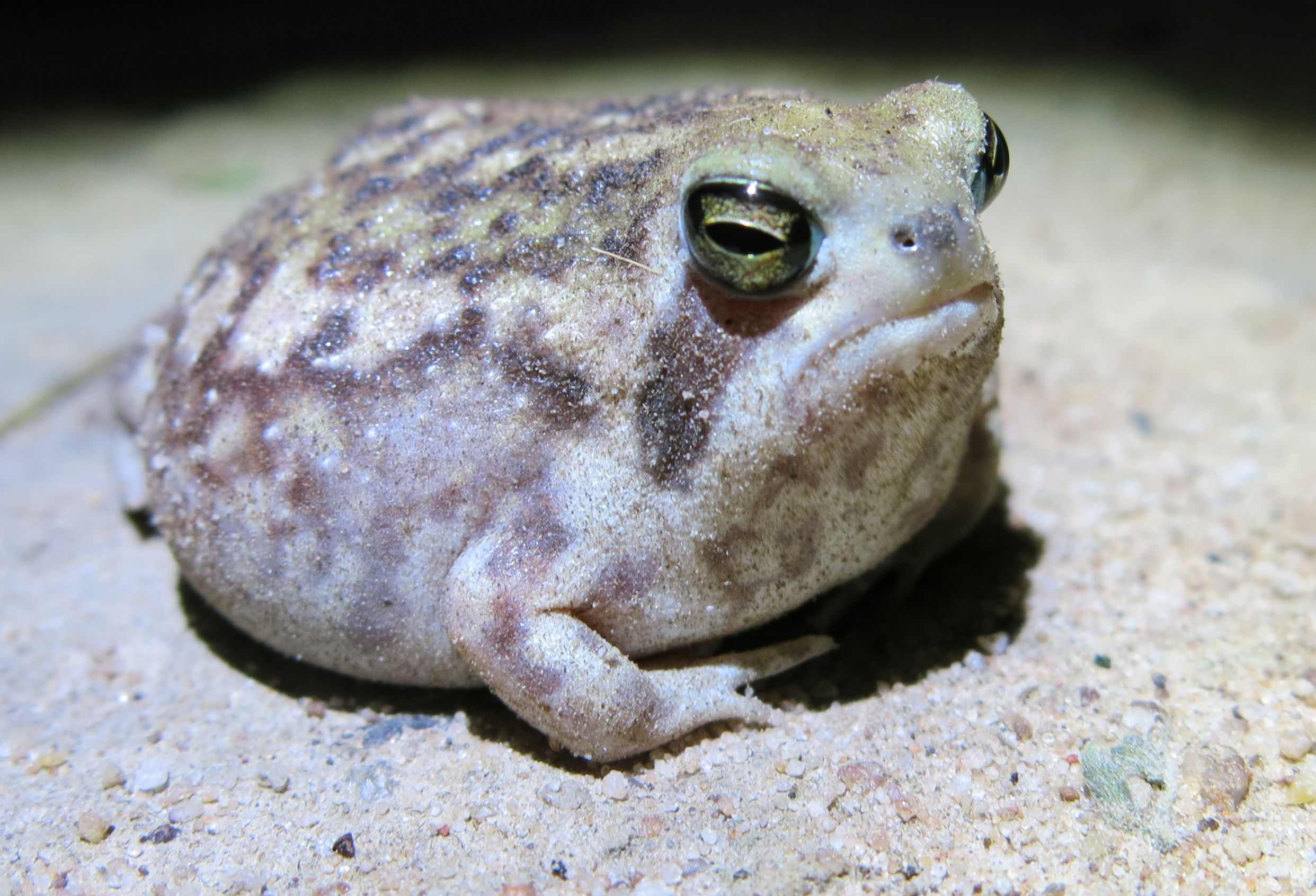
- Bushveld rain frog, B. adspersus

Scientific classification
- Kingdom: Animalia
- Phylum: Chordata
- Class: Amphibia
- Order: Anura
- Family: Brevicipitidae
- Genus: Breviceps; Merrem, 1820

Type species
- Breviceps gibbosus Linnaeus, 1758

Species
- See text

= Breviceps =

Genus of amphibians

Breviceps is a genus of frogs in the family Brevicipitidae. Species in the genus Breviceps are commonly known as rain frogs or short-headed frogs, recognized by their stout, rounded bodies, short limbs, and small, flat snouts. They occur in arid to semiarid climates of Eastern and Southern Africa.

== Taxonomy ==
The genus Breviceps consists of 21 species, of which most occur in southern Africa. There are five species found in the Western Cape, B. gibbosus, B. fuscus (black rain frog), B. rosei (Rose's rain frog), B. montanus (mountain rain frog) and B. acutirostris (strawberry rain frog). Two species are found in arid areas and other species are found in the eastern and northern parts of southern Africa.

- Breviceps acutirostris, Strawberry rain frog Poynton, 1963
- Breviceps adspersus, Common rain frog Peters, 1882
- Breviceps bagginsi, Bilbo's rain frog Minter, 2003
- Breviceps batrachophiliorum, Boston rain frog Du Preez, Netherlands & Minter, 2025
- Breviceps branchi, Branch's rain frog Channing, 2012
- Breviceps carruthersi, Phinda rain frog Du Preez, Netherlands, and Minter, 2017
- Breviceps fichus, Highland rain frog Channing and Minter, 2004
- Breviceps fuscus, Black rain frog Hewitt, 1925
- Breviceps gibbosus, Giant rain frog (Linnaeus, 1758)
- Breviceps macrops, Desert rain frog Boulenger, 1907
- Breviceps montanus, Mountain rain frog Power, 1926
- Breviceps mossambicus, Mozambique rain frog Peters, 1854
- Breviceps namaquensis, Namaqua rain frog Power, 1926
- Breviceps ombelanonga, Angolan rain frog Nielsen et al., 2020
- Breviceps passmorei, Passmore's rain frog Minter, Netherlands, and Du Preez, 2017
- Breviceps pentheri, Thicket rain frog Werner, 1899
- Breviceps poweri, Power's rain frog Parker, 1934
- Breviceps rosei, Rose's rain frog Power, 1926
- Breviceps sopranus, Whistling rain frog Minter, 2003
- Breviceps sylvestris, Forest rain frog FitzSimons, 1930
- Breviceps verrucosus, Plaintive rain frog Rapp, 1842

== Reproduction ==
Species of the genus Breviceps are sexually dimorphic: males are much smaller than females. This prevents normal amplexus; instead, males and females produce an adhesive secretion from the skin that allows them to "stick" together during mating.

== Ecology and behavior ==
Species of the genus Breviceps spend most of the year underground; even when on the surface, they are inconspicuous because of their slow movements and cryptic coloration. They walk rather than hop. They are able to burrow rapidly, backwards, into the soil by using the enlarged, spade-like metatarsal tubercles on their feet.

These frogs emerge after rain to feed on small arthropods such as ants, termites, beetles, moths, woodlice, amphipods, juvenile millipedes, and caterpillars hence the name rain frogs. Reproduction also occurs during the rainy season. Choruses start immediately after heavy rains, although this may be delayed in colder areas. Eggs are laid in chambers below the surface of the soil, rocks, or fallen logs. After hatching, the movements of the tadpoles make the remains of the egg mass into a froth. The female remains close to the egg chamber until the tadpoles are fully developed.
