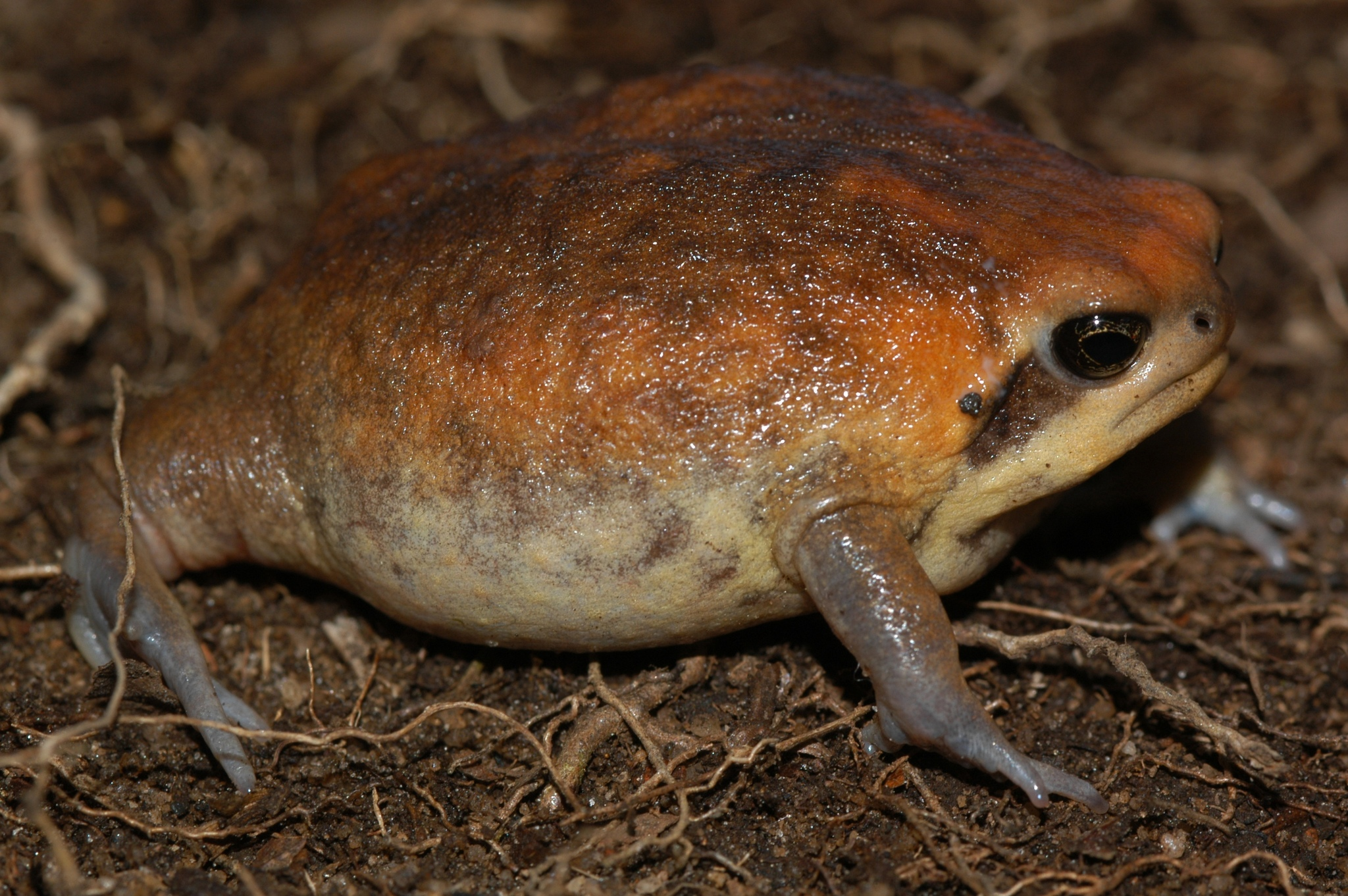
- subsp. sylvestris
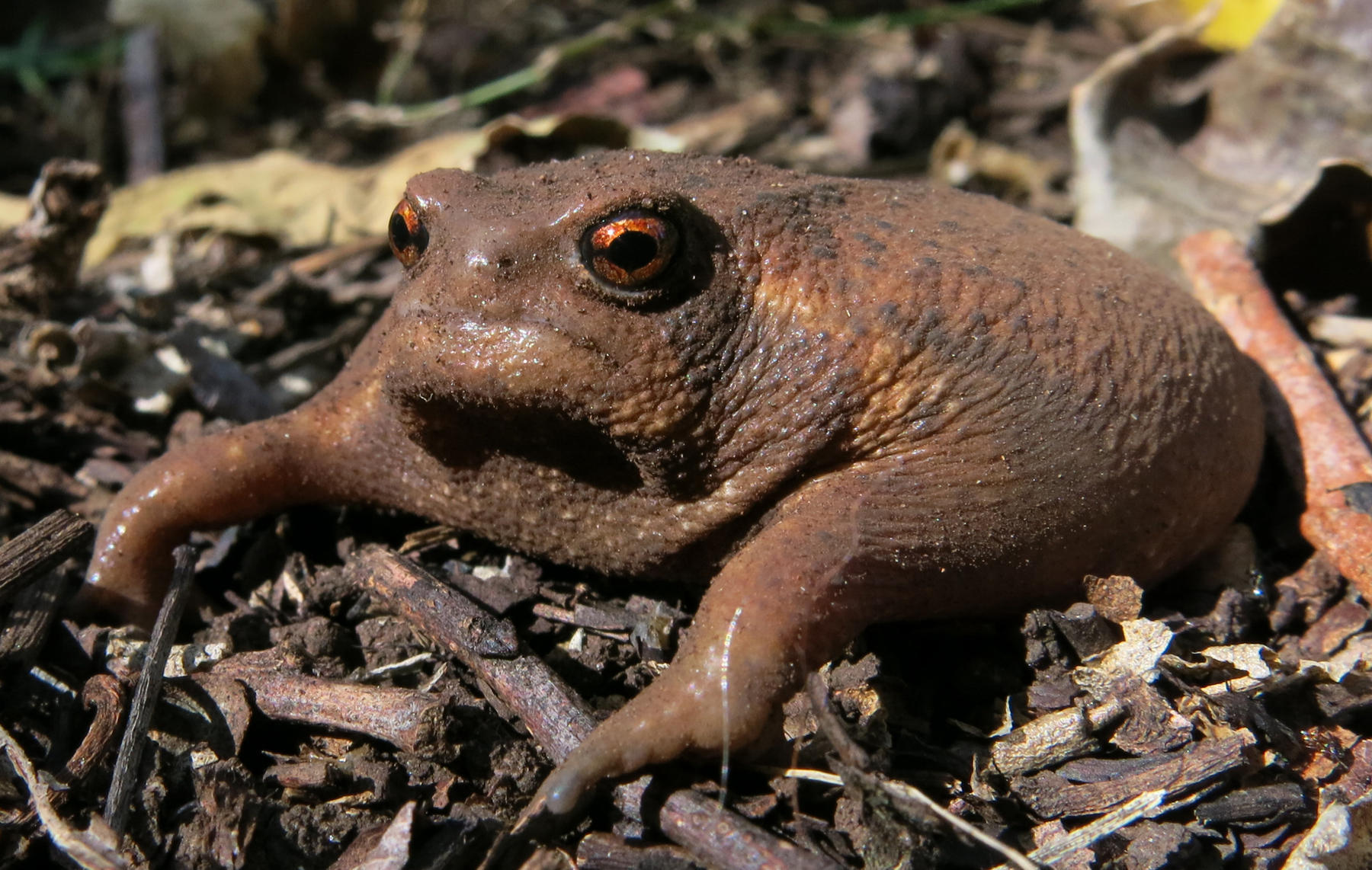
- subsp. taeniatus

Conservation status
- Near Threatened (IUCN 3.1)

Scientific classification
- Kingdom: Animalia
- Phylum: Chordata
- Class: Amphibia
- Order: Anura
- Family: Brevicipitidae
- Genus: Breviceps
- Species: B. sylvestris

Binomial name
- Breviceps sylvestris FitzSimons, 1930

= Forest rain frog =

Species of amphibian

The forest rain frog (Breviceps sylvestris) is a species of frog in the family Brevicipitidae. It is endemic to Limpopo, South Africa. Two allopatric subspecies are recognized: the nominate one, Breviceps sylvestris sylvestris, and Breviceps sylvestris taeniatus Poynton, 1963 from near Soutpansberg. Its natural habitats are temperate forests, temperate grassland, and rural gardens. It is threatened by habitat loss.

Forest rain frogs can range in colour from red, orange, yellow, green, and purple. They can also vary in size from a mere 2 cm and grow to be about 10 cm in body length. The purple frogs are known to contain a defence mechanism consisting of a toxic chemical on their slimy exterior. If contact is made with this toxin the temporary effect of paralysis can occur.

Breviceps sylvestris taeniatus is a subspecies of the forest rain frog and is found near Soutpansberg. It is separated from the main species by uninhabitable terrain.
