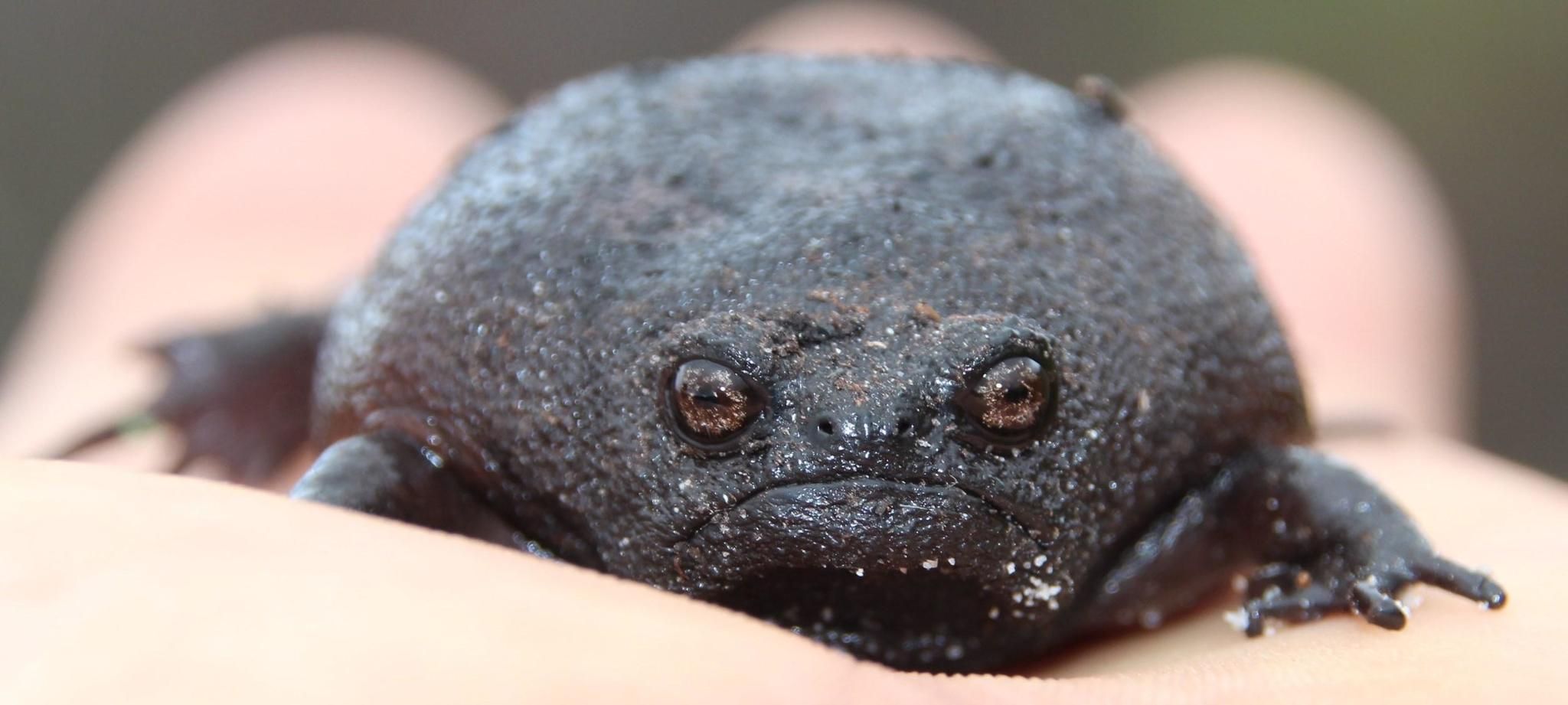

Conservation status
- Least Concern (IUCN 3.1)

Scientific classification
- Kingdom: Animalia
- Phylum: Chordata
- Class: Amphibia
- Order: Anura
- Family: Brevicipitidae
- Genus: Breviceps
- Species: B. fuscus

Binomial name
- Breviceps fuscus Hewitt, 1925
- Breviceps fuscus range Extant (resident)

= Breviceps fuscus =

Species of amphibian endemic to South Africa

Breviceps fuscus, also known as black rain frog, plain rain frog, brown short-headed frog, and Tsitsikamma rainfrog, is a species of frogs in the family Brevicipitidae. It is endemic to the southern coast of South Africa.

== Description ==
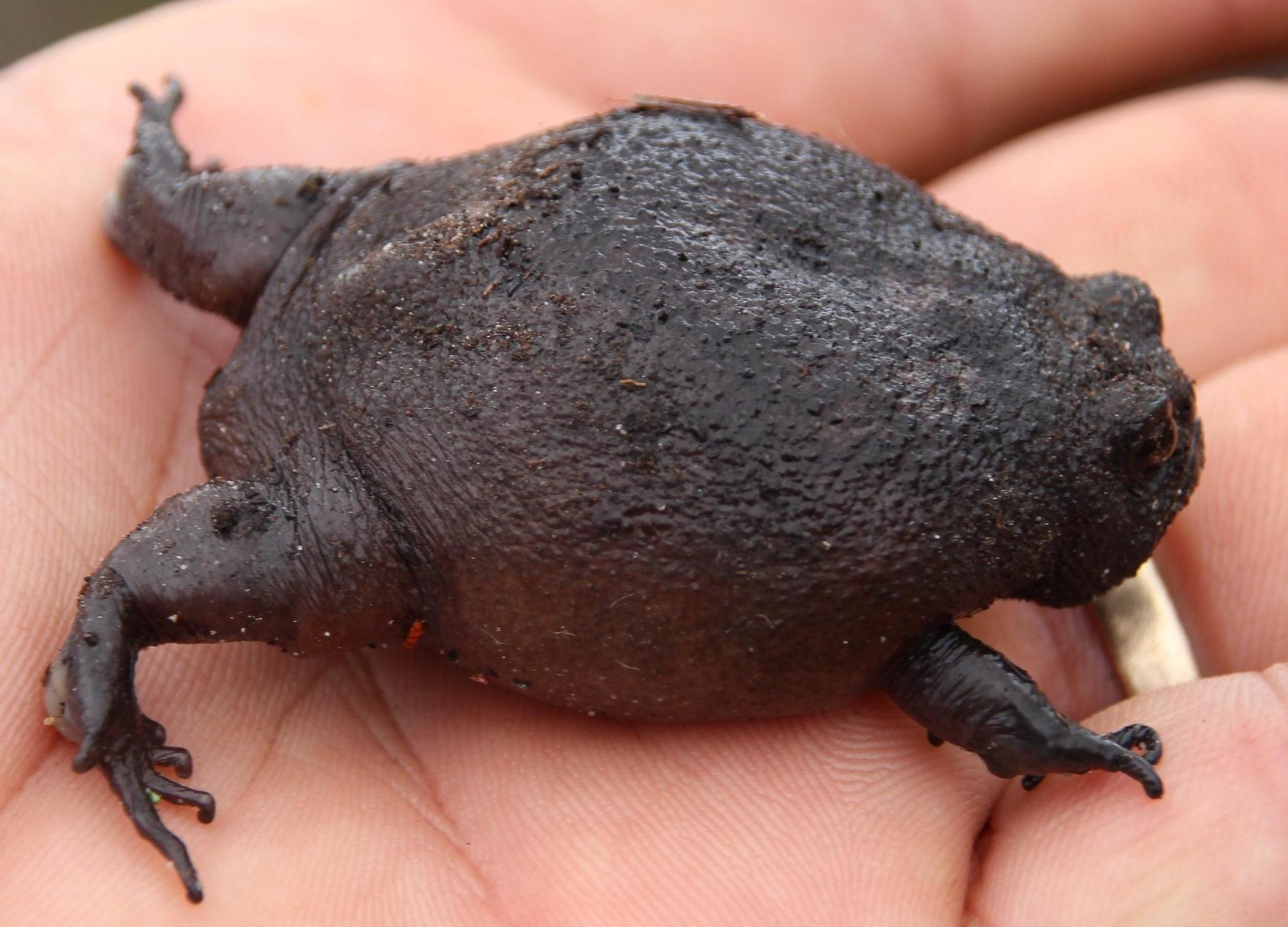
Side view

Breviceps fuscus have a round body with short limbs and toes. Its feet are inward facing which allows the frog to burrow much more effectively. They grow to about 40–51 mm (1.6–2.0 in) in snout–vent length.This species can also live anywhere from 4 to 15 years in age. Skin has no warts, but pronounced widely spaced lumps or small tubercles and pitting are present. Colouration is typically dark brown or nearly black, with a slightly lighter ventrum and no pigmented patterns. They have a squat body and their legs are rather short, which gives the frog its distinctive, avocado-like appearance.

== Distribution and habitat ==
The species is only found on the southern slopes of the Cape Fold Belt from Swellendam to the Outeniqua Mountains, at elevations of up to over 1,000 m (3,300 ft). It is a burrowing species inhabiting fynbos and forest fringes and does not require the presence of open water. They prefer to dwell near dislodged sand piles due to their burrowing behaviour.

== Behaviour ==
Breviceps fuscus is a burrowing frog, and can be found in tunnels up to 150 mm deep or among vegetation up to about 30 cm above the ground, and it generally prefers to avoid water. The frog generally spends most of its time underground as it does not require open water and is primarily nocturnal. At night the black rain frog emerges from its burrow to scavenge for food and sometimes mate.

== Reproduction ==
Males call from within burrows (sometimes while guarding eggs) and from above-ground vegetation. The call is a short (0.2 s) "chirp", with a dominant frequency of 1.8 kHz. The eggs are laid within burrows with small (15 mm) openings and about 30–40 mm deep. Each nest consists of approximately 42–43 yellow eggs that are 5 mm in diameter inside 8 mm capsules.

=== Young ===
Like frogs in the family Brevicipitidae in general, Breviceps fuscus show direct development (i.e., there is no free-living larval stage). This means that the breviceps fuscus does not have tadpoles and instead has young which emerge from the egg as smaller versions of the adults. These are called froglets.

== Survival ==
Breviceps fuscus has many survival mechanisms to combat predators as unlike other frogs they are not able to jump or swim to evade predators due to their unique body shape, including the ability to burrow up to 20 centimetres (7.9 in). They have also been observed to puff up their body to make them several times larger as a defence mechanism. When in danger, they fill up with air to appear bigger in an attempt to ward off predators like bush pigs, birds, and snakes. They are also able to use this ability to jam themselves in their burrows preventing some snakes from pulling them out of the burrow Their distress call is a short high pitched chirp. They also have small lumps all over their body. This is believed to be a mechanism to deter predators as to a predator these lumps appear poisonous although it is not believed that they are poisonous.

== Conservation ==
Breviceps fuscus is a locally abundant species but the exact population is not known. It does not tolerate habitat disturbance, so habitat loss caused by afforestation, the spread of alien vegetation, and too frequent fires are threats to it. However, overall, its habitat is well protected and it occurs in several protected areas.

== Taxonomy ==
The specific name fuscus refers to the dark colouration of this species as the animal is usually dark brown or black. The black rain frog was first described by John Hewitt, in 1925 after a specimen was collected in Knysna.

== Feeding ==
Like many other frogs Breviceps fuscus is an insectivore which feeds on small insects, spiders, insect larvae and worms. The main source of protein for Breviceps fuscus is crickets. If they eat crickets bigger in size they can go through impaction. Impaction can cause blockage of the intestine which can cause death.

== Classification ==
The Breviceps fuscus was originally classified as a member of the Microhylidae but polygenic research led to the family Brevicipitidae being classified as a family of its own and Breviceps fuscus was included in it along with the other frogs in its genus.
