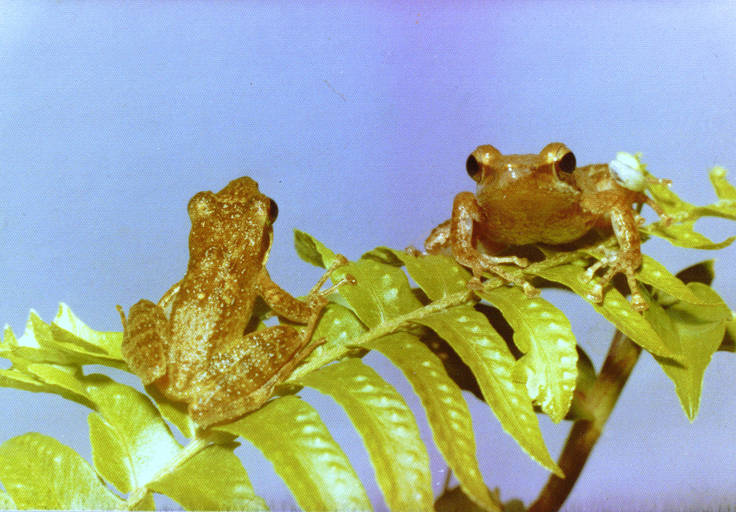

Conservation status
- Near Threatened (IUCN 3.1)

Scientific classification
- Kingdom: Animalia
- Phylum: Chordata
- Class: Amphibia
- Order: Anura
- Family: Pyxicephalidae
- Subfamily: Cacosterninae
- Genus: Natalobatrachus; Methuen & Hewitt, 1912
- Species: N. bonebergi

Binomial name
- Natalobatrachus bonebergi Methuen & Hewitt, 1912

= Natalobatrachus bonebergi =

Species of amphibian

Natal diving frog (Natalobatrachus bonebergi), also known as the Natal diving frog, Boneberg's frog, or Kloof frog), is a species of frog in the family Pyxicephalidae. It is the only species within the monotypic genus Natalobatrachus. It is endemic to South Africa. Its natural habitats are temperate forests and rivers and it is threatened by habitat loss.

This is a small- to medium-sized frog, females reaching 37 mm and males 25 mm in length.

== Distribution and habitat ==
The frog's habitat is restricted to south eastern South Africa, where it ranges from the Dwesa Nature Reserve in the Eastern Cape to Oribi Gorge Nature Reserve and other reserves in south and central KwaZulu-Natal province, only found below 900 m above sea level. The habitat of the frog consists of ground-coastal bush and gallery bush: especially afforestation strips along rivers.

== Reproduction ==
Mating occurs in streams and eggs are attached to branches hanging over the water, in egg clutches that looks like bales of foam. After hatching, the tadpoles fall down into the water where they develop further into small frogs.

== Threatened status ==
Natalobatrachus bonebergi is a rare and endangered species. Deterioration of reproduction water and pollution of its habitat impact negatively on its survival rate. In addition, large parts of its range made way for sugarcane plantations, forestry and other forms of cultivation. The frog can not survive in open areas, it needs moist places around rivers or coastal areas.
