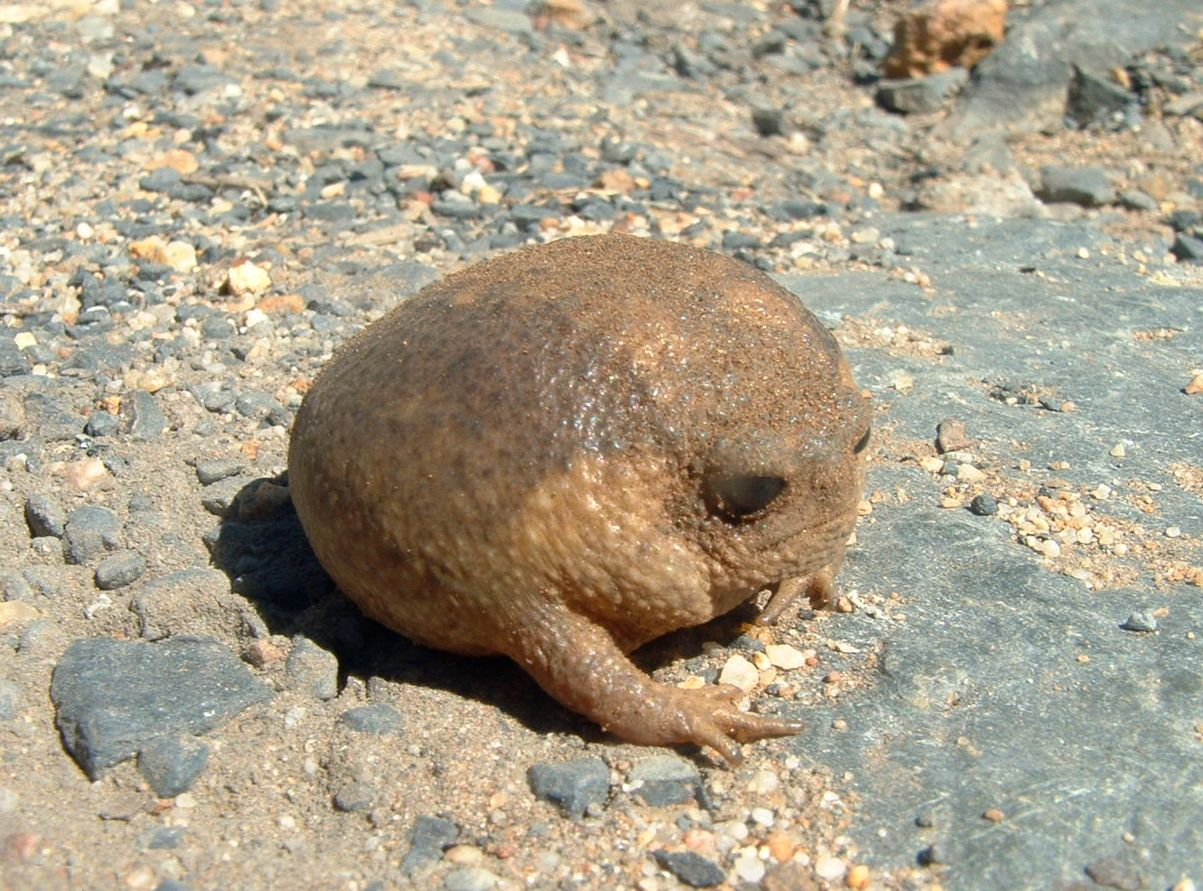

Conservation status
- Vulnerable (IUCN 3.1)

Scientific classification
- Kingdom: Animalia
- Phylum: Chordata
- Class: Amphibia
- Order: Anura
- Family: Brevicipitidae
- Genus: Breviceps
- Species: B. gibbosus

Binomial name
- Breviceps gibbosus (Linnaeus, 1758)

= Cape rain frog =

Species of amphibian

The cape rain frog or giant rain frog (Breviceps gibbosus) is a species of frog in the family Brevicipitidae. Adults grow up to 45 mm in length. It was the first African frog species to be scientifically described by Carl Linnaeus in 1758, under the name Rana gibbosa. It is the most common and largest of rain frogs. The name "rain frog" that is applied to the genus refers to a belief that these frogs bring rain.

== Distribution and habitat ==
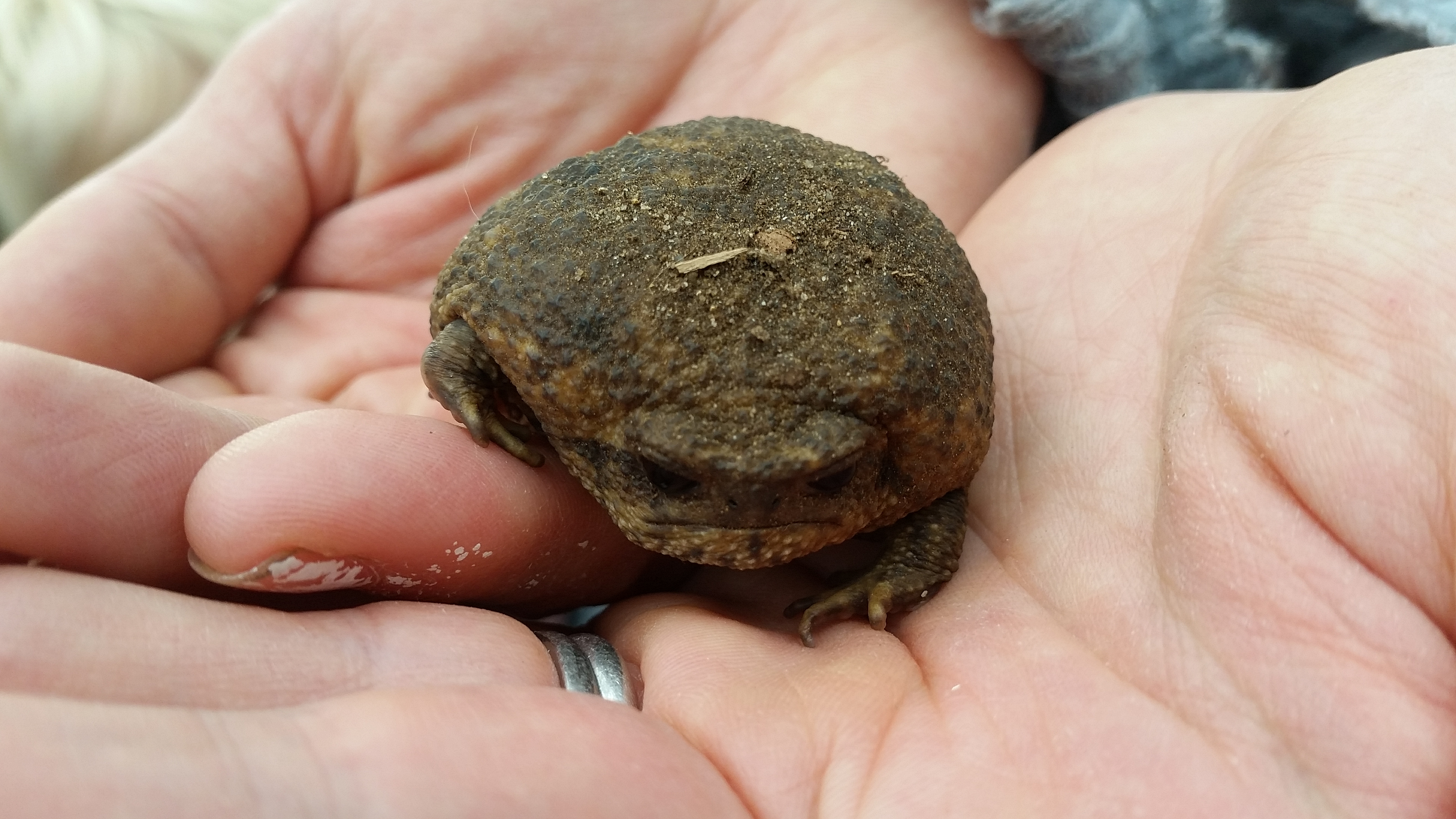
At Cape Town

The species is endemic to South Africa, where it occurs in the far southwestern Cape, in Cape Town and northwards as far as Citrusdal. In this area it inhabits Mediterranean-type shrubby vegetation, known as fynbos, renosterveld, pastureland on farms, rural gardens, and even urban areas. It seems to adapt well to suburban gardens, but like most frog species it is vulnerable to herbicide poisons and domestic pets.

== Physiology ==
Breviceps gibbosus is part of the family Brevicipitidae. All species in this family of frog are considered terrestrial breeders by laying and burrowing eggs. The cape rain frog exhibits a rounded shape, with short arms. There are sexual dimorphisms between sexes, the females are larger in size compared to the males. Cape rain frogs are about 2 inches (4.5 cm) in length, with legs shorter than their bodies. Physical distinctions include brown skin with a white dotted pattern on their stomachs, they have forward facing eyes and lack webbing between their toes. The African rain frogs are also known as narrow mouth toads, due to the small mouth and narrow head that they possess.

Cape rain frogs exhibit a unique calling sound, a series of short intervals of squawking is produced by burrowing males during mating season.

=== Mating physiology ===
The African cape rain frog possesses special glands that secrete a glue-like substance used for amplexus. These adhesive glands are located on the pectoral region of male frogs and on the dorsum of female frogs. Studies suggest these adhesive glands have evolved independently. The females of this species have a higher concentration of the adhesive glands than the males. These glands assist mating pairs in sticking to one another during sexual reproduction.

== Ecology ==
The Cape rain frog lives underground and usually emerges just before rains (whence it got its common name). It may also be seen in misty or damp conditions. Its burrowing provides a role in aerating soil in the southwestern Cape. It feeds on worms and small insects. When alarmed, it increases its apparent size by swallowing air; hence the species is given the Afrikaans common name of blaasoppie. As burrowing frogs, they have thick, muscular legs, which enable them to burrow for shelter. This species does not require open water to breed; in fact, it cannot swim and will drown if placed in water.

== Habitat ==
The cape rain frog is endemic to Fynbos biomes in the southwestern parts of the Western Cape of South Africa. These ecosystems are lush with natural shrub land, forests and woodlands. Fynbos biomes are located in both the Southern and Western cape of South Africa. Rain frogs are also known to live underground in burrows they create by burrowing backward while simultaneously scooping sand to cover themselves. Cape rain frogs can also be found in developed areas like agricultural grounds, pine plantations and residential gardens.

== Breeding ==
During mating season, males call from beneath vegetation or from their burrows so that the females can locate them. Since he is too small to get a firm grip on the female, she secretes a sticky liquid that glues him to her back. Fertilization takes place in a burrow that the female has dug where groups of approximately 22 eggs are laid. They lay fertile eggs and jelly capsules, which provide moisture for the developing froglets. The females will remain burrowed near the eggs until they become young froglets without undergoing the tadpole stage.

== Conservation ==
The species is currently classified as near threatened by the IUCN. The main threats consist of ongoing habitat loss in the diminishing fynbos biomes, through the expansion of urban sprawl and agriculture. The main threat to this species survival is habitat destruction and degradation. Due to rapid urbanization, the cape frogs Fynbos habitat suffers from destruction and fragmentation which diminishes the species population. Currently there are no restoration projects proposed, however there are populations of this species in projected parks. Parks include Cape Peninsula National Park, Helderberg Nature Reserve and Paarl Mountain Nature Reserve. Domestic conservation efforts concerning the cape frog populations in residential areas include prevention of paving ground and prevention of converting open spaces into urban development.

== Feeding ==
The diet of the cape rain frog consist mainly worms, termites and other insects.

== Survival ==
Like most frogs in its genus, the cape rain frog has a unique body shape preventing it from jumping or swimming. Thus, its survival mechanisms are similar to other frogs in its genus: it is able to inflate its body to appear bigger and keep away predators, and is also able to emit a high pitched chirp when it is in danger. It may also retreat to its burrow to hide from potential danger.
