= Whistling rain frog =

Conservation status
- Least Concern (IUCN 3.1)

Scientific classification
- Kingdom: Animalia
- Phylum: Chordata
- Class: Amphibia
- Order: Anura
- Family: Brevicipitidae
- Genus: Breviceps
- Species: B. sopranus

Binomial name
- Breviceps sopranus Minter, 2003

Species of amphibian

The whistling rain frog (Breviceps sopranus) is a species of frogs in the family Brevicipitidae. It is found in South Africa, Eswatini, and possibly Mozambique. Its natural habitats are temperate forests, dry savanna, moist savanna, and sandy shores. It is threatened by habitat loss.
