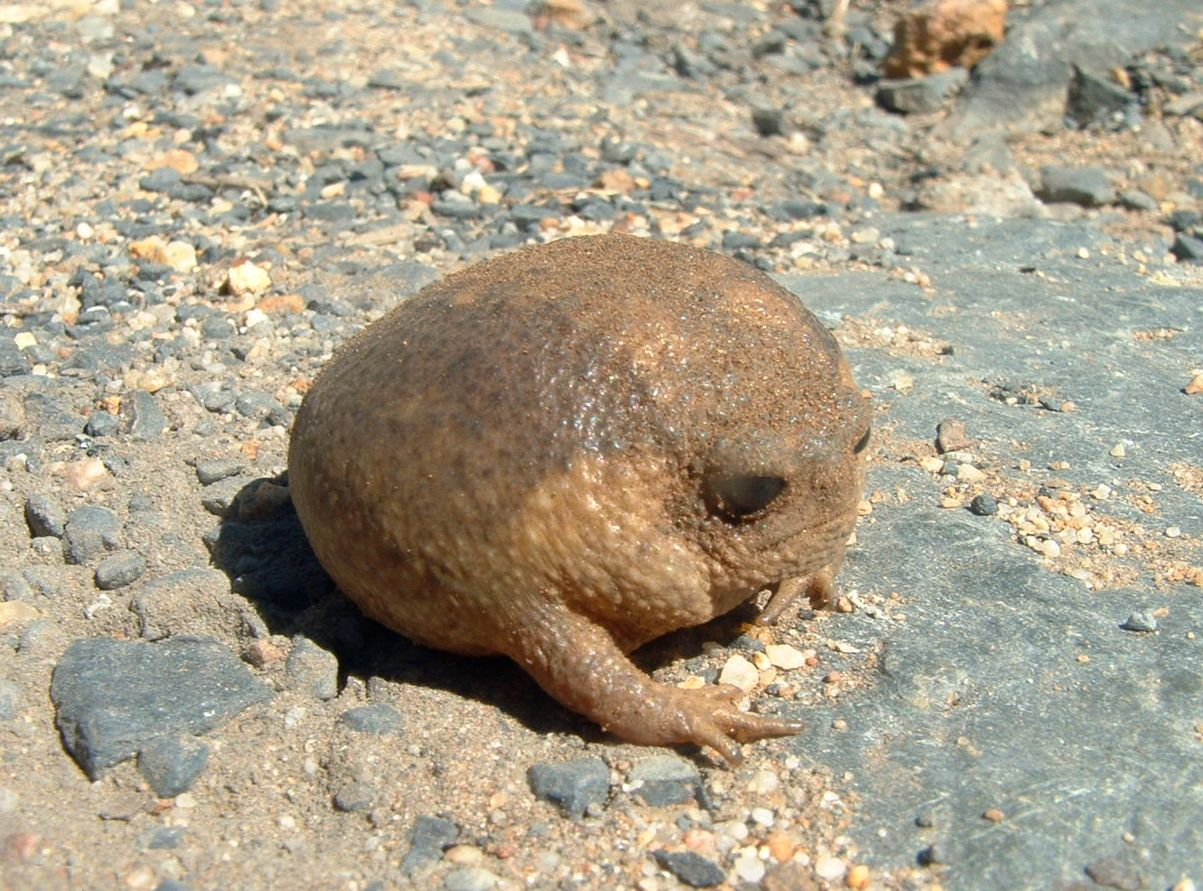
- Cape rain frog (Breviceps gibbosus)

Scientific classification
- Kingdom: Animalia
- Phylum: Chordata
- Class: Amphibia
- Order: Anura
- Clade: Afrobatrachia
- Family: Brevicipitidae; Bonaparte, 1850

Type genus
- Breviceps Merrem, 1820

Type species
- Breviceps gibbosus Linnaeus, 1758

Genera
- See text.

= Brevicipitidae =

Family of amphibians

The Brevicipitidae or rain frogs are a small family of frogs found in eastern and southern Africa. As of 2025, it contains 38 species in 5 genera. Formerly included as subfamily in Microhylidae (narrow-mouth frogs), phylogenetic research has indicated the brevicipitine frogs should be considered as a family, with Hemisotidae (shovelnose frogs) as the most closely related sister taxon.

Most adult brevicipitine frogs are not easily seen as they spend extended periods of time in soil or leaf litter. However, some species might be partly arboreal at times. Many species show strong sexual size dimorphism, with females being much larger than males.

Frogs in Breviceps and Probreviceps genera are known to breed by direct development, in which small froglets emerge from eggs without intervening aquatic tadpole phase. It is likely that the same applies to the other genera, too. Because male Breviceps frogs are smaller than their female counterparts, amplexus is not possible; however mating pairs glue themselves together using excretions from holocrine glands on the ventrum of the male and similar glands on the dorsum of the female. The frogs lay small clutches of 13–56 fairly large eggs (4–8 mm diameter not including the protective capsule) in cover, often in burrows. With some species either the male or the female stays with eggs or close to the egg chamber, though the details and extent of brood care is poorly understood within Brevicipitidae as a whole.

== Genera ==
- Balebreviceps Largen & Drewes, 1989 (1 species)
- Breviceps Merrem, 1820 (21 species)
- Callulina Nieden, 1911 (9 species)
- Probreviceps Parker, 1931 (6 species)
- Spelaeophryne Ahl, 1924 (1 species)
