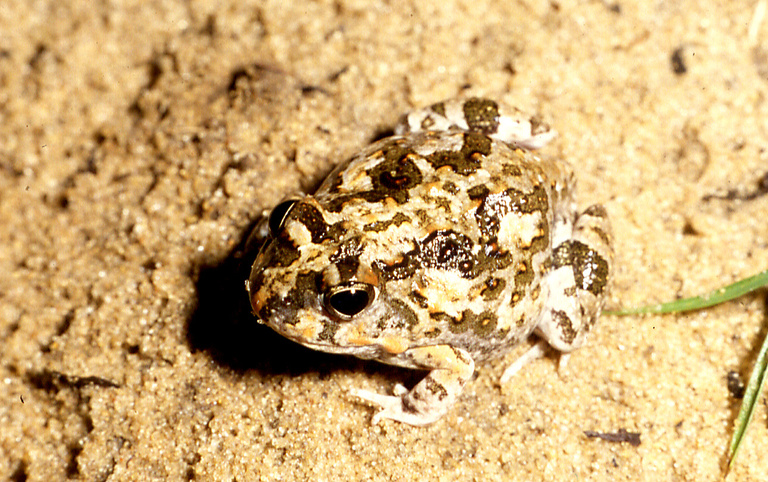

Conservation status
- Least Concern (IUCN 3.1)

Scientific classification
- Kingdom: Animalia
- Phylum: Chordata
- Class: Amphibia
- Order: Anura
- Family: Pyxicephalidae
- Genus: Tomopterna
- Species: T. krugerensis

Binomial name
- Tomopterna krugerensis Passmore and Carruthers, 1975

= Knocking sand frog =

Species of amphibian

The knocking sand frog (Tomopterna krugerensis), also known as sandveld pyxie or Kruger burrowing frog, is a species of frog in the family Pyxicephalidae. It is found in southern Angola, Namibia, Botswana, southern Zimbabwe, southern Mozambique, northern South Africa, and Eswatini. This species was discovered during the evening of 23 October 1973 in South Africa's Kruger National Park. Two weeks after heavy rain fell in the area, large numbers were found around the Machayi and Mathlaguza Pans in the northeastern part of the Park near the Mozambican frontier.

== Description ==
Males measure 38–45 mm (1.5–1.8 in) and females 41–46 mm (1.6–1.8 in) in snout–vent length. It is a stout frog with short, broad head. The fore limbs are also short and stout, whereas the hind limbs are longer than body when extended. Fingers have no webbing whereas the toes have some webbing. The tympanum is present but can be indistinct. The dorsum is typically cream-beige, but may vary from very pale grey-brown to a mid-brown. There are many irregular, khaki-brown markings, outlined with dark-brown to black. There are also bright orange tubercles scattered over entire dorsum, each with a black rim. The venter is immaculate white.

Tomopterna krugerensis is not morphologically distinguishable from Tomopterna cryptotis and Tomopterna tandyi, but the male advertisement call is distinct: a slowly repetitive, percussive "knock" or "cluck", almost like a metronome.

== Habitat and conservation ==
Knocking sand frog is a savanna species that seems to prefer sandy soils. It can also survive in disturbed areas. Breeding takes place in temporary waterbodies (both large and small), including pans, vleis, and flooded grassland. It is an adaptable species facing no significant threats and occurring in many protected areas—including the Kruger National Park, after which it is named.
