= Tomopterna gallmanni =

Conservation status
- Least Concern (IUCN 3.1)

Scientific classification
- Kingdom: Animalia
- Phylum: Chordata
- Class: Amphibia
- Order: Anura
- Family: Pyxicephalidae
- Genus: Tomopterna
- Species: T. gallmanni

Binomial name
- Tomopterna gallmanni Wasonga and Channing, 2013

Species of frog

Tomopterna gallmanni, commonly known as Gallmann's sand frog, is a species of frog in the family Pyxicephalidae. It is a cryptic species endemic to Kenya.

== Range and habitat ==
Endemic to Kenya, Tomopterna gallmanni is known from the Laikipia Plateau, Baragoi, Maralal, and Naivasha. It has been recorded at several protected areas within this range, including Laikipia National Reserve, the Lewa Wildlife Conservancy, Ngare Ndare Forest, and the Ol Pejeta Conservancy. It occurs in moist, open grassland, savannah, and woodland habitats at altitudes between 1,300–2,000 m (4,300–6,600 ft) above sea level, and is known to inhabit both man-made and naturally occurring water bodies.

== Description ==
Tomopterna gallmanni is a stout, toad-like frog with a small head and thick legs. The dorsal markings consist of several irregular dark grey patches on a lighter grey background, sometimes with a complete or broken white line running down the back. Brown warts with black borders are present on the dorsum and sides. The underside is a creamy white colour that becomes pinkish on the palms and around the vent. T. gallmanni is a cryptic species that closely resembles other species in the genus Tomopterna. It can be differentiated from similar species by its smooth ventral surface that becomes coarsely granular towards the thighs and vent. The tadpoles of this species are unknown.

== Ecology ==
The advertisement call of Tomopterna gallmanni consists of a series of notes, each composed of one or two pulses, that resembles a knocking sound. Males call from the edges of temporary pools and eggs are laid singly. This species is abundant at breeding sites and has been recorded alongside Ptychadena anchietae and Ptychadena mascareniensis. It is known to burrow underground during periods of persistent dry weather.
