= Tomopterna ahli =

Conservation status
- Data Deficient (IUCN 3.1)

Scientific classification
- Kingdom: Animalia
- Phylum: Chordata
- Class: Amphibia
- Order: Anura
- Family: Pyxicephalidae
- Genus: Tomopterna
- Species: T. ahli

Binomial name
- Tomopterna ahli (Deckert, 1938)

Synonyms
- Arthroleptella ahli Deckert, 1938; Tomopterna damarensis Dawood and Channing, 2002

Species of frog

Tomopterna ahli, commonly known as the Damaraland sand frog or Damara sand frog, is a species of frog in the family Pyxicephalidae. It is found in central to north-western Namibia and southwestern Angola.

== Description ==
Five adult males in the type series of the formerly recognized Tomopterna damarensis measure 38–41 mm (1.5–1.6 in) in snout–vent length; the range in a larger sample is 35–41 mm (1.4–1.6 in). The body is stout. The snout is rounded. The tympanum is round; the supra-tympanic ridge is weakly developed. The fingers have no webbing but the toes are partially webbed. The dorsum is reddish brown with darker brown patches. The eyelids have three darker bars. The shanks and feet are brown with darker patches. The lower surfaces are whitish except for the throat that is darkly pigmented around jaw line.

The male advertisement call is a series of notes, emitted at a rate of seven per second. The call has two harmonics that are equally emphasized, one of 1.1–1.2 kHz and the other of 2.4–2.5 kHz. The call is similar to that of Tomopterna tandyi but has higher repeat rate and two instead of one emphasized harmonics.

== Habitat and conservation ==
Tomopterna ahli have been found in a range of dry, sandy habitats near permanent water; it appears that it needs access to permanent water bodies. The type series of the formerly recognized Tomopterna damarensis was collected from pools in a riverbed.

The International Union for Conservation of Nature (IUCN) has assessed this species as "data deficient" because of uncertainty concerning its range and ecological requirements, later research has shown it to be relatively widespread and tolerant of a range of ecological conditions. Large parts of its range enjoys nominal protection in the form of a series of community conservancies in Namibia. In Angola, it occurs in the Iona National Park. The most obvious potential threat to this species is changes in availability of surface water.
