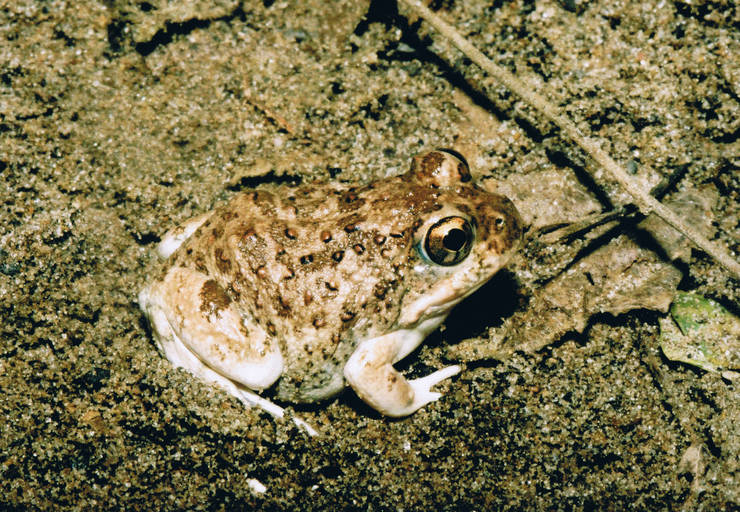

Conservation status
- Least Concern (IUCN 3.1)

Scientific classification
- Kingdom: Animalia
- Phylum: Chordata
- Class: Amphibia
- Order: Anura
- Family: Pyxicephalidae
- Genus: Tomopterna
- Species: T. tandyi

Binomial name
- Tomopterna tandyi Channing and Bogart, 1996

= Tandy's sand frog =

Species of amphibian

Tandy's sand frog (Tomopterna tandyi) is a species of frog in the family Pyxicephalidae. It is found in South Africa, Botswana, Namibia, and south-western Angola, and from inland Tanzania and Kenya. It probably occurs more widely within and between these two disjunct areas. The specific name tandyi honours Robert Mills Tandy, an American biologist, herpetologist, and photographer and the collector of the type material.

== Systematics ==
This species is a tetraploid that probably originated as a hybrid between Tomopterna cryptotis and Tomopterna delalandii. It is not possible to distinguish it morphologically from these two species, and many distributional records do not separate between T. tandyi and T. cryptotis.

== Description ==
The holotype, an adult male, measures 38 mm (1.5 in) in snout–vent length. The tympanum is visible. The fingers have no webbing whereas the toes are partially webbed. The dorsum has patches of grey or olive on lighter background. The dorsal warts are reddish brown with black marks. Many individuals have a dark interocular bar.

The male advertisement call is a series of continuously repeated notes. The call rate is about 7–8 notes per second and the emphasized frequency about 2700–2800 Hz. The call is distinct from T. delalandii and T. cryptotis.

== Habitat and conservation ==
Tandy's sand frog occurs in dry savanna, bush land, and grassland at elevations below 1,800 m (5,900 ft). It can often be found in agricultural areas and is associated with loose sandy soils where pans form. Breeding takes place in ephemeral shallow water, ditches, streams, and dams, after individuals emerge from burrows at the start of the rainy season. The eggs are deposited in pools formed by rainfall, and the tadpoles develop in these.

It is an adaptable species that is locally common in parts of its range. It is unlikely to face more than localized threats. It is probably occurs in many protected areas.
