= Cacosternum thorini =

Conservation status
- Endangered (IUCN 3.1)

Scientific classification
- Kingdom: Animalia
- Phylum: Chordata
- Class: Amphibia
- Order: Anura
- Family: Pyxicephalidae
- Genus: Cacosternum
- Species: C. thorini

Binomial name
- Cacosternum thorini Conradie, 2014

Species of frog

Cacosternum thorini, the hogsback dainty frog, is a species of frog endemic to South Africa.
