= Katanga caco =

Conservation status
- Data Deficient (IUCN 3.1)

Scientific classification
- Kingdom: Animalia
- Phylum: Chordata
- Class: Amphibia
- Order: Anura
- Family: Pyxicephalidae
- Genus: Cacosternum
- Species: C. leleupi

Binomial name
- Cacosternum leleupi Laurent, 1950

Species of amphibian

The Katanga caco or Katanga metal frog (Cacosternum leleupi) is a species of frog in the family Pyxicephalidae, endemic to Democratic Republic of the Congo. Its natural habitats are moist savanna, subtropical or tropical seasonally wet or flooded lowland grassland, intermittent rivers, swampland, and intermittent freshwater marshes.
