= Tomopterna wambensis =

Conservation status
- Least Concern (IUCN 3.1)

Scientific classification
- Kingdom: Animalia
- Phylum: Chordata
- Class: Amphibia
- Order: Anura
- Family: Pyxicephalidae
- Genus: Tomopterna
- Species: T. wambensis

Binomial name
- Tomopterna wambensis Wasonga and Channing, 2013

Species of frog

Tomopterna wambensis, commonly known as the Wamba sand frog, is a species of frog in the family Pyxicephalidae. It is a cryptic species native to Kenya and Tanzania.

== Range and habitat ==
Tomopterna wambensis ranges from Illeret in northern Kenya through central and southern Kenya to Arusha in Tanzania. It may also occur in southern Ethiopia near the Kenyan border, but this has not been confirmed. It occurs in both dry and moist bushland, grassland, savannah, and woodland habitats with sandy soils at altitudes between 500–2,000 m (1,600–6,600 ft) above sea level, and is known to inhabit both man-made and naturally occurring water bodies.

== Description ==
Tomopterna wambensis is a stout, toad-like frog with a small head, slender forelegs, and stout hindlegs. The dorsal markings consist of several greenish-brown patches on a lighter background and a dense covering of reddish-brown warts that are sometimes bordered with black. The underside is mostly cream-coloured with a dark throat. T. wambensis is a cryptic species that closely resembles other species in the genus Tomopterna, but can be differentiated from similar species by its call. The tadpoles of this species are unknown.

== Ecology ==
The advertisement call of Tomopterna wambensis consists of a series of high-pitched, rapidly repeating notes. Though it utilises both man-made and natural water bodies, most breeding congregations occur in seasonal wetlands. Males call from the waters edge and eggs are laid singly in shallow water. This species and been recorded alongside Hildebrandtia ornata, Kassina senegalensis, Ptychadena anchietae, and Ptychadena mascareniensis. It is known to burrow underground during periods of persistent dry weather.
