= Tomopterna milletihorsini =

Conservation status
- Data Deficient (IUCN 3.1)

Scientific classification
- Kingdom: Animalia
- Phylum: Chordata
- Class: Amphibia
- Order: Anura
- Family: Pyxicephalidae
- Genus: Tomopterna
- Species: T. milletihorsini

Binomial name
- Tomopterna milletihorsini (Angel, 1922)

Synonyms
- Arthroleptis milleti-horsini Angel, 1922; Arthroleptis milletihorsini Angel, 1922; Schoutedenella milletihorsini (Angel, 1922)

Species of frog

Tomopterna milletihorsini, commonly known as the Mali screeching frog, is a species of frog in the family Pyxicephalidae. It is endemic to Mali where it is known from near Bamako (its type locality) and Nara. This species was transferred from Arthroleptis to Tomopterna in 2008, the old placement still being reflected in its common name.

Its habitat and ecology are unknown. Presumably it breeds by direct development and is therefore not dependent upon water for breeding. The type specimen, now lost, measured 18 mm (0.71 in) in snout–vent length.
