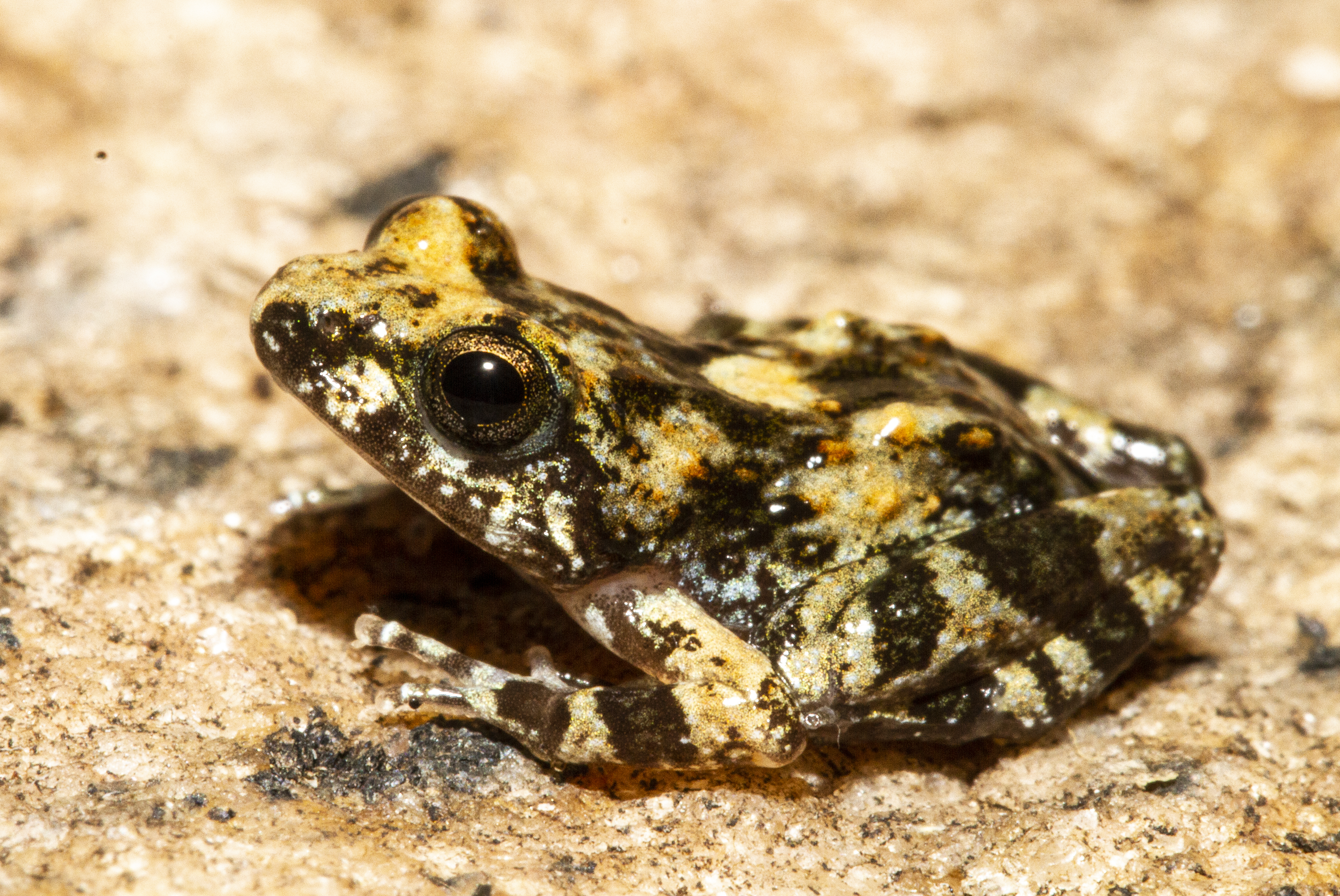

Conservation status
- Critically Endangered (IUCN 3.1)

Scientific classification
- Kingdom: Animalia
- Phylum: Chordata
- Class: Amphibia
- Order: Anura
- Family: Pyxicephalidae
- Genus: Nothophryne
- Species: N. unilurio

Binomial name
- Nothophryne unilurio Conradie, Bittencourt-Silva, Farooq, Loader, Menegon, and Tolley, 2018
- Nothophryne unilurio is only known from the Taratibu Hills in northern Mozambique

= Nothophryne unilurio =

Species of frog

Nothophryne unilurio, also known as the Quirimbas mongrel frog, is a species of frog in the family Pyxicephalidae described in 2018. It is endemic to Taratibu Nills in northern Mozambique. The specific name unilurio is derived from Lúrio University, or Unilúrio, the name of a Mozambican university responsible for the research that culminated with the finding of the new species.

== Description ==
The type series consists of two adult males that measure 17 and 19 mm (0.67 and 0.75 in) in snout–urostyle length. N. unilurio can be distinguished from other Nothophryne species by the following characteristics: absence of a median lingual process on the dorsal surface of the tongue, tympanum clearly visible (obscured in Nothophryne baylissi). Its genome sequence differs from the other species in the genus by 6–7% (16S p-distance) and 4–5% (RAG1 p-distance). This species is allopatric with all other Nothophryne species.

== Distribution ==
Currently only known from low lying inselbergs in north eastern Cabo Delgado Province of Mozambique. The type locality is situated at the Taratibu's Conservancy Area, near the Base camp, in the Quirimbas National Park.

== Ecology ==
Males call hidden from under rocks and moss near streams which is found on exposed rock surface. Freshly laid eggs and tadpoles were seen on a tiny film of water flowing over rock surface.
