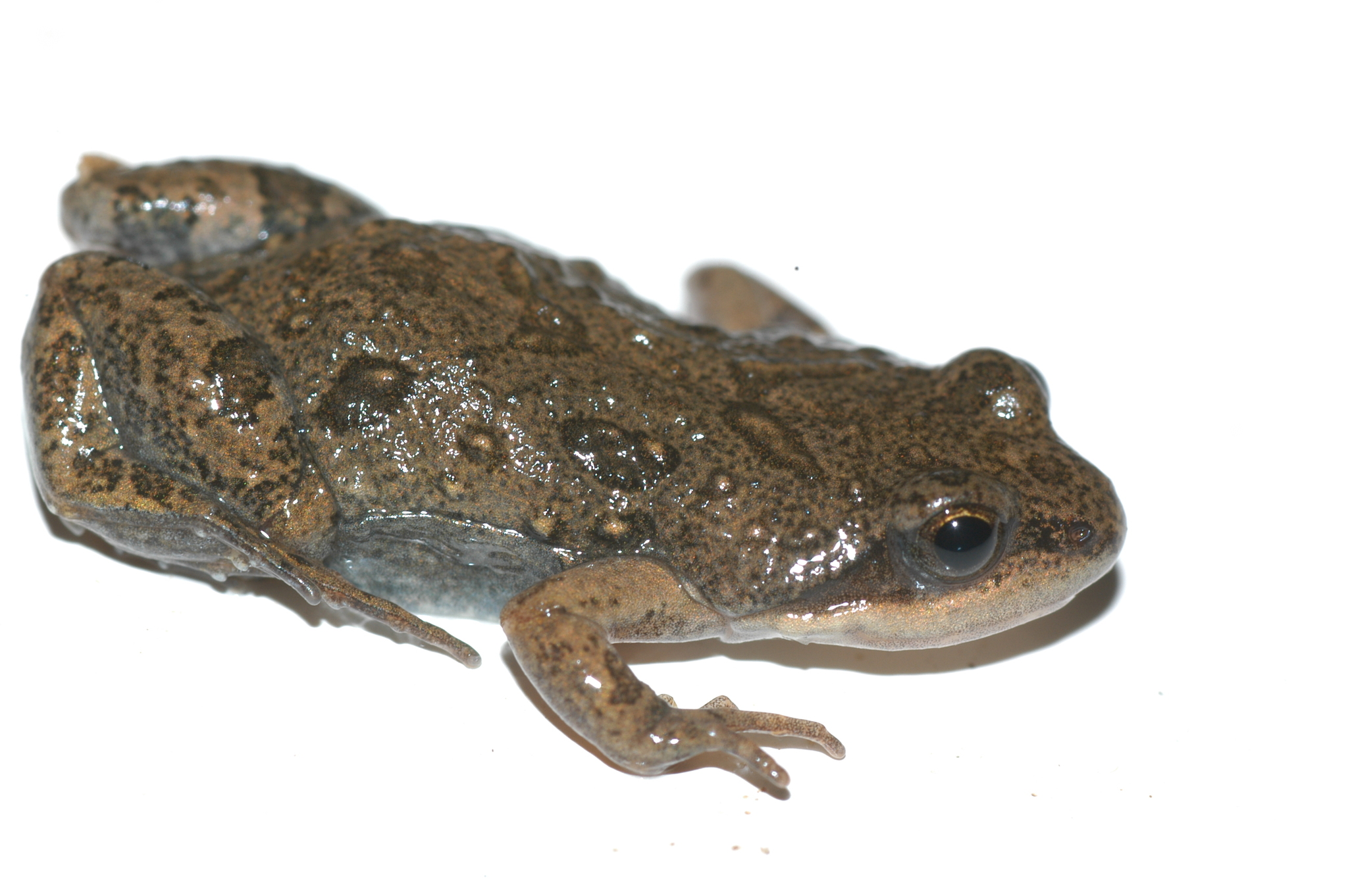

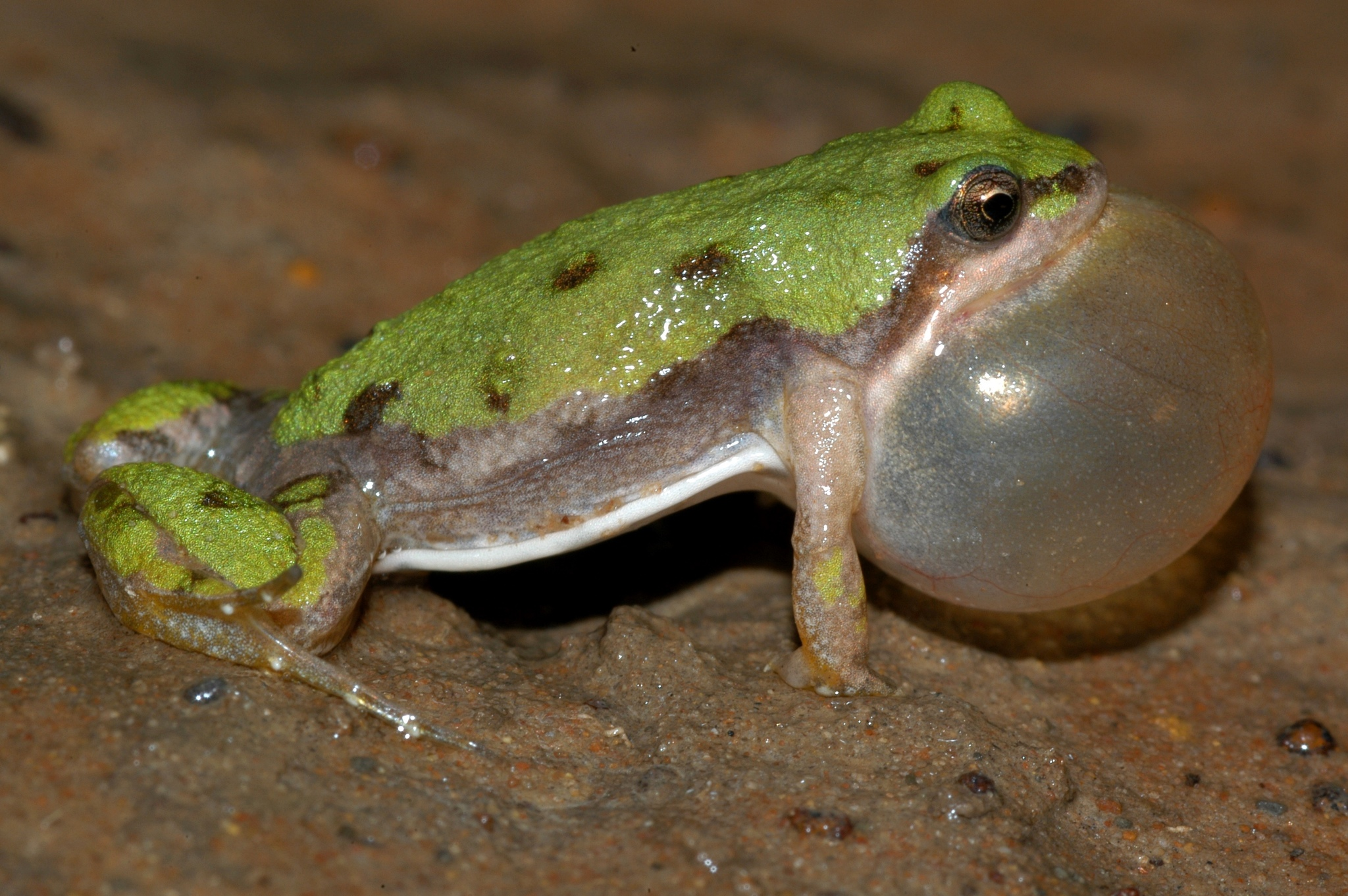

Conservation status
- Least Concern (IUCN 3.1)

Scientific classification
- Kingdom: Animalia
- Phylum: Chordata
- Class: Amphibia
- Order: Anura
- Family: Pyxicephalidae
- Genus: Cacosternum
- Species: C. boettgeri

Binomial name
- Cacosternum boettgeri (Boulenger, 1882)
- IUCN range (2013)

= Boettger's dainty frog =

Species of amphibian

The Boettger's dainty frog or common caco (Cacosternum boettgeri) is a species of frog in the family Pyxicephalidae endemic to southern Africa.

== Range ==
It is found in Botswana, Ethiopia, Kenya, Lesotho, Mozambique, Namibia, Rwanda, South Africa, Eswatini, Tanzania, Zambia, Zimbabwe, possibly Angola, and possibly Uganda.

== Habitat ==
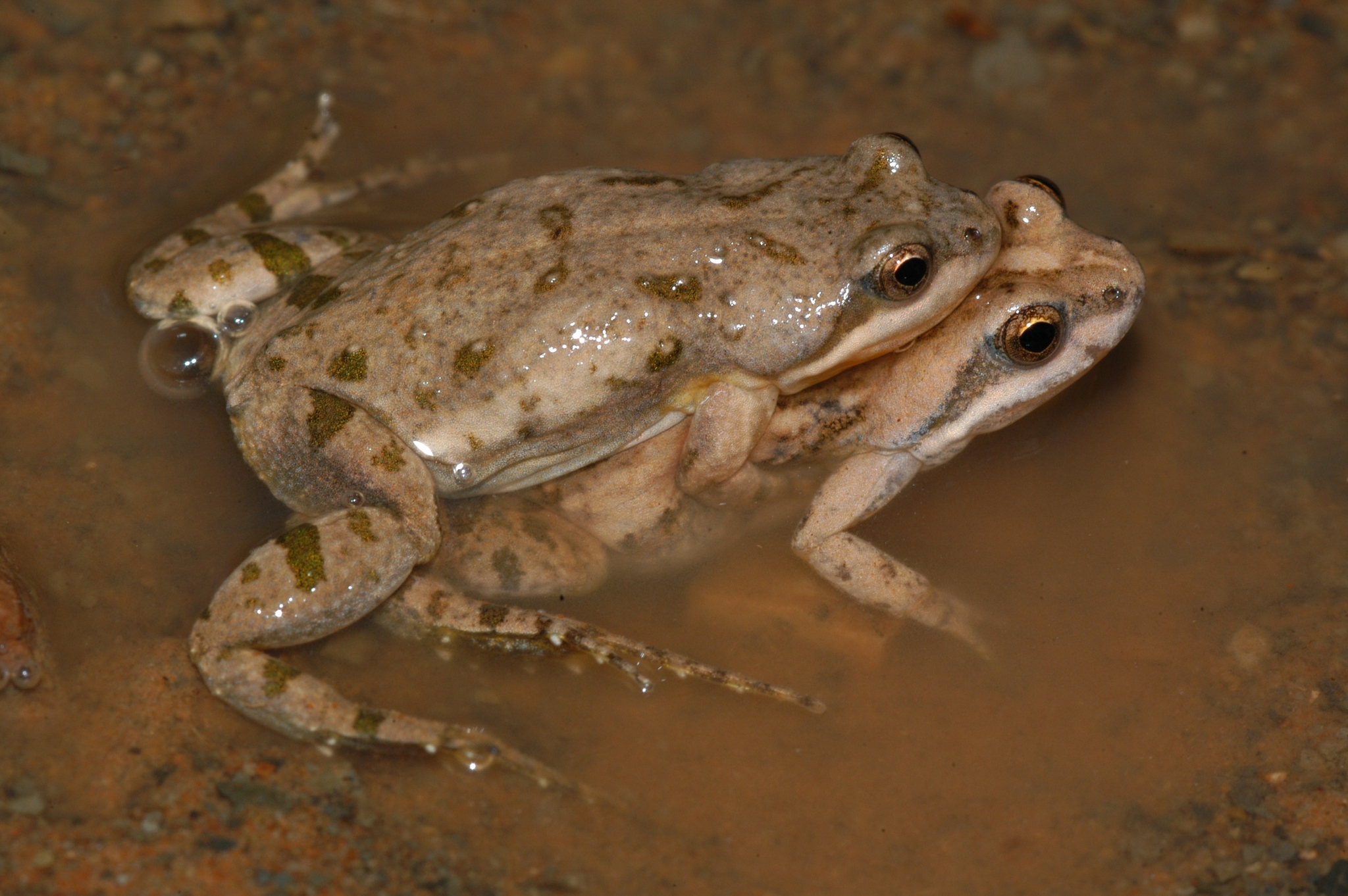
Mating

Its natural habitats are dry savanna, moist savanna, subtropical or tropical dry shrubland, subtropical or tropical moist shrubland, subtropical or tropical dry lowland grassland, subtropical or tropical seasonally wet or flooded lowland grassland, subtropical or tropical high-altitude grassland, swampland, intermittent freshwater lakes, intermittent freshwater marshes, arable land, pastureland, plantations, rural gardens, ponds, seasonally flooded agricultural land, and canals and ditches.
