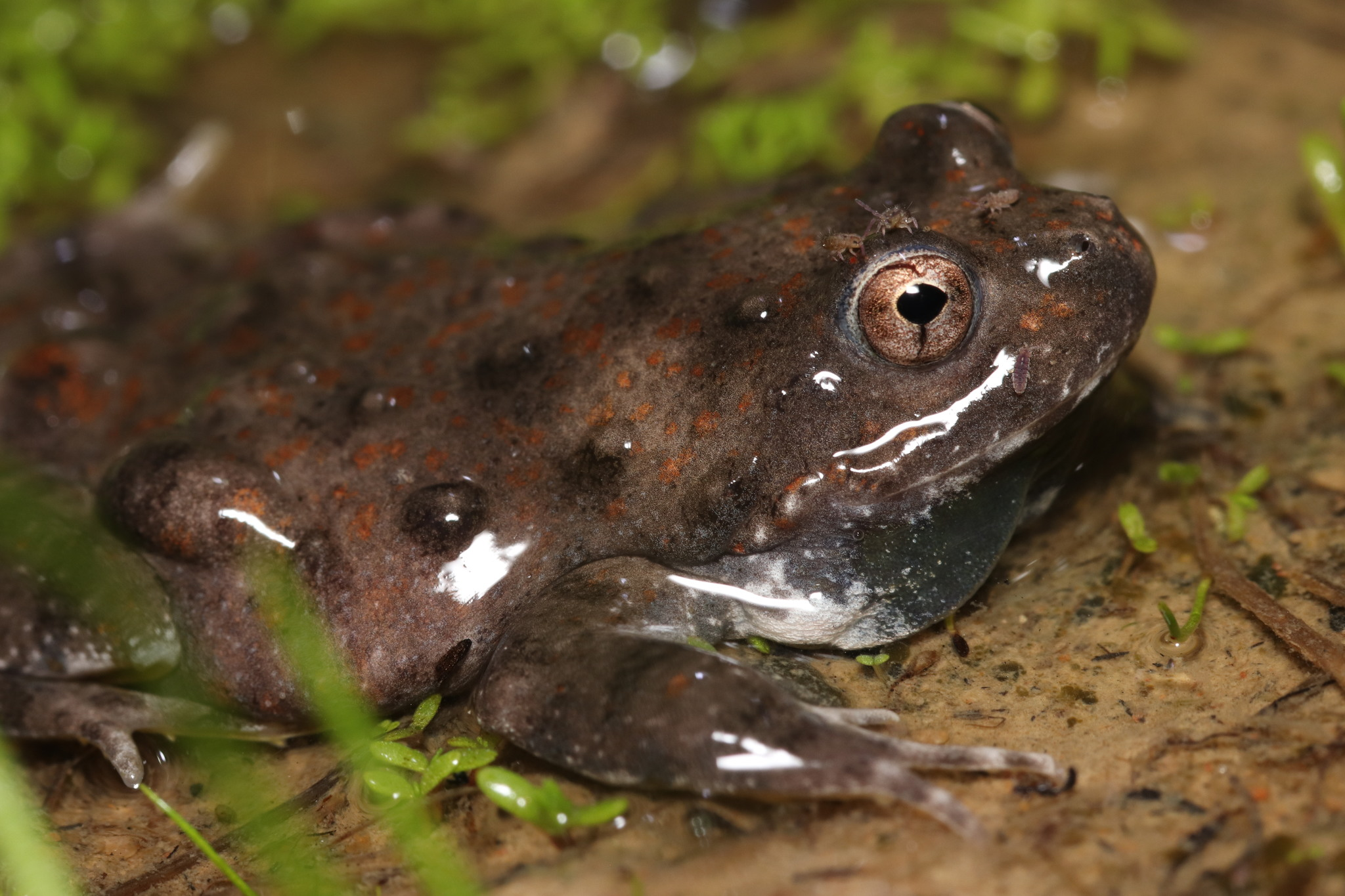

Conservation status
- Near Threatened (IUCN 3.1)

Scientific classification
- Kingdom: Animalia
- Phylum: Chordata
- Class: Amphibia
- Order: Anura
- Family: Pyxicephalidae
- Genus: Cacosternum
- Species: C. capense

Binomial name
- Cacosternum capense Hewitt, 1925

= Cape caco =

Species of amphibian

The Cape caco or Cape dainty frog (Cacosternum capense) is a species of frog in the family Pyxicephalidae. It is endemic to South Africa. Its natural habitats are Mediterranean-type shrubby vegetation, subtropical or tropical dry lowland grassland, freshwater marshes, intermittent freshwater marshes, arable land, pastureland, and canals and ditches. It is threatened by habitat loss.
