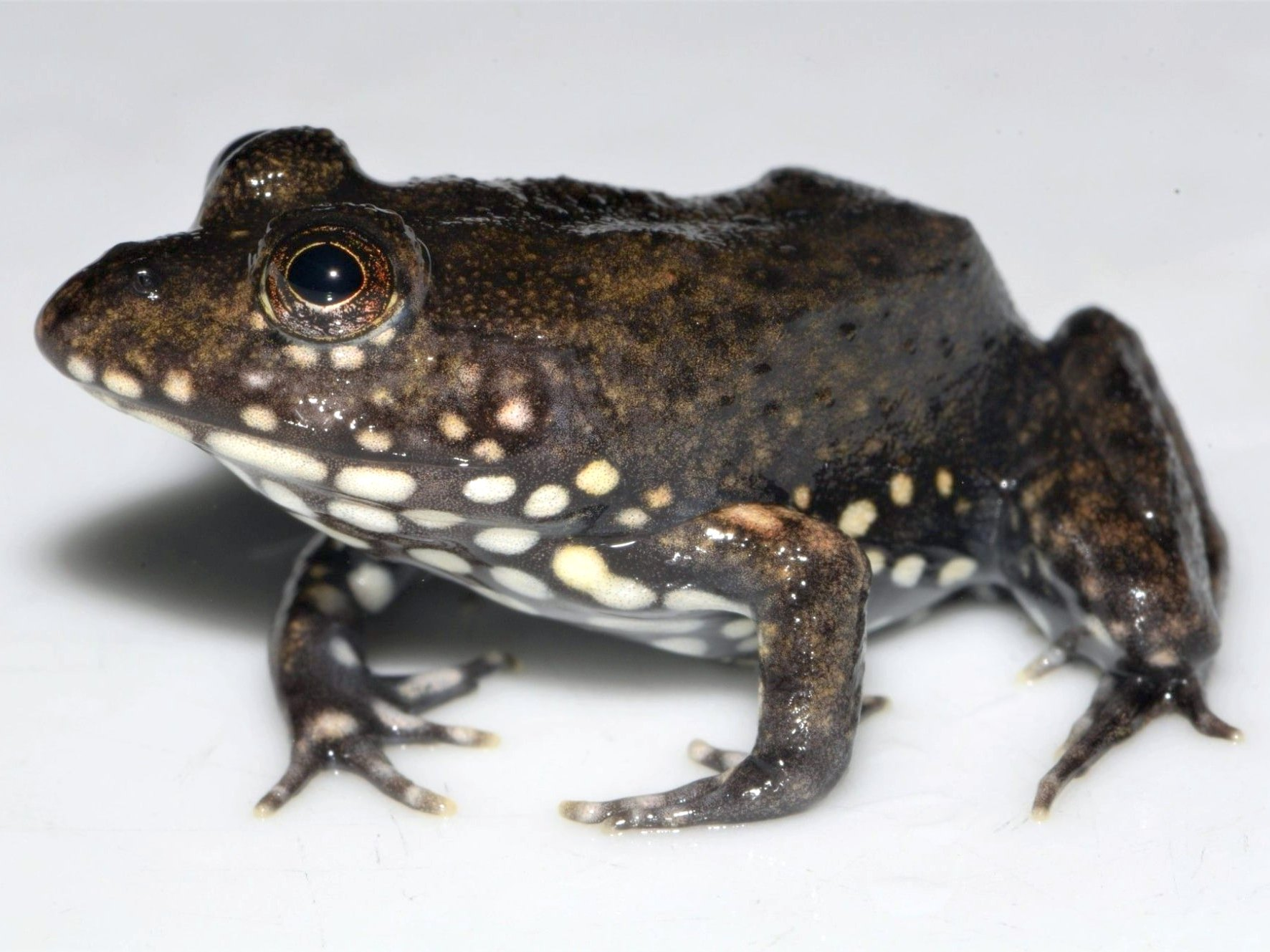

Conservation status
- Least Concern (IUCN 3.1)

Scientific classification
- Kingdom: Animalia
- Phylum: Chordata
- Class: Amphibia
- Order: Anura
- Family: Pyxicephalidae
- Genus: Aubria
- Species: A. masako

Binomial name
- Aubria masako Ohler and Kazadi, 1990

= Aubria masako =

Masako fishing frog

Species of amphibian

Aubria masako is a species of frog in the family Pyxicephalidae. It is found in southeastern Cameroon, eastern Gabon, southwestern Central African Republic, northern Republic of the Congo, and eastward to the central Democratic Republic of the Congo, with one (doubtful) record from Angola; it might occur in Equatorial Guinea. Common names Masako ball frog and Masako fishing frog have been coined for this species. Whether it is distinct from Aubria subsigillata has been debated, but at present it is treated as a valid species.

== Description ==
Adult males typically measure 63–79 mm (2.5–3.1 in) in snout–vent length; females are larger. Their maximum length is about 100 mm (3.9 in). The tympanum is large and distinct, and the supratympanic fold is present. The finger and toe tips are rounded, but not enlarged. The fingers have only some dermal fringes, whereas the toes are moderately webbed. The dorsum is brown and has dark speckles. A white or off-white vertebral line may be present. The underside is speckled white over a brown background, turning almost entirely white in older individuals (the exception being from the throat). Both sexes have conspicuous yellow-brown femoral glands close to the knee.

== Habitat and ecology ==
A. masako occurs in swamps or along small streams in lowland forests, gallery forests, and degraded secondary habitats (farm bush) in the forest zone. Breeding takes places in standing water - pools, swamps, and marshes. It is nocturnal, burrowing in mud when inactive. Somewhat unusually for an amphibian, its diet consists of fish (e.g., Epiplatys), arthropods, and other amphibians, including younger conspecifics.

== Conservation ==
Although it is considered an adaptable species, in parts of its range, A. masako is only known from pristine habitats. Nevertheless, this species is not considered to face any significant threats. It is presumed to be found in several protected areas.
