= Striped caco =

Conservation status
- Least Concern (IUCN 3.1)

Scientific classification
- Kingdom: Animalia
- Phylum: Chordata
- Class: Amphibia
- Order: Anura
- Family: Pyxicephalidae
- Genus: Cacosternum
- Species: C. striatum

Binomial name
- Cacosternum striatum FitzSimons, 1947

Species of amphibian

The striped caco or striped metal frog (Cacosternum striatum) is a species of frog in the family Pyxicephalidae, found in Lesotho and South Africa, and possibly Mozambique and Eswatini. Its natural habitats are subtropical or tropical moist shrubland, subtropical or tropical seasonally wet or flooded lowland grassland, subtropical or tropical high-altitude grassland, rivers, and swampland. It is threatened by habitat loss.
