= Rough sand frog =

Conservation status
- Least Concern (IUCN 3.1)

Scientific classification
- Kingdom: Animalia
- Phylum: Chordata
- Class: Amphibia
- Order: Anura
- Family: Pyxicephalidae
- Genus: Tomopterna
- Species: T. tuberculosa

Binomial name
- Tomopterna tuberculosa (Boulenger, 1882)

Species of amphibian

The rough sand frog (Tomopterna tuberculosa) is a species of frog in the family Pyxicephalidae. It is found in Angola, the Democratic Republic of the Congo, Namibia, Tanzania, Zambia, and Zimbabwe, and possibly Malawi and Mozambique. Its natural habitats are dry savanna, moist savanna, freshwater marshes, and intermittent freshwater marshes.
