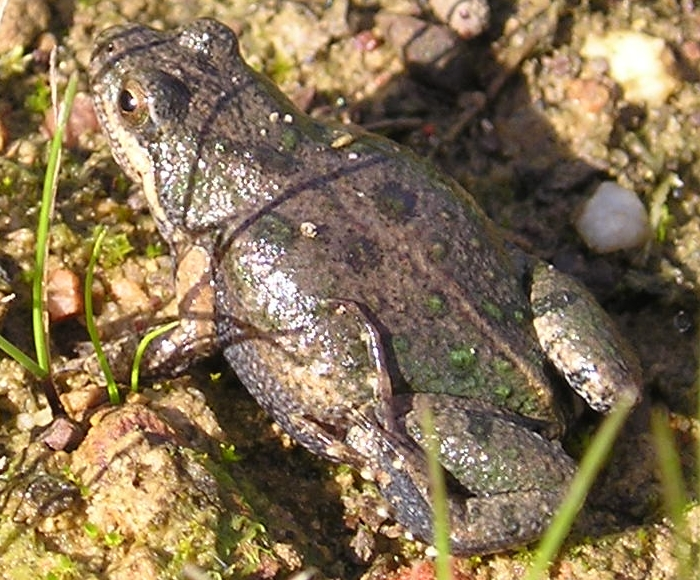

Conservation status
- Near Threatened (IUCN 3.1)

Scientific classification
- Kingdom: Animalia
- Phylum: Chordata
- Class: Amphibia
- Order: Anura
- Family: Pyxicephalidae
- Genus: Cacosternum
- Species: C. platys

Binomial name
- Cacosternum platys Rose, 1950

= Flat caco =

Species of amphibian

The flat caco, flat dainty frog, or smooth dainty frog (Cacosternum platys) is a species of frog in the family Pyxicephalidae, endemic to South Africa. Its natural habitats are Mediterranean-type shrubby vegetation, subtropical or tropical seasonally wet or flooded lowland grassland, intermittent rivers, intermittent freshwater marshes, arable land, pastureland, rural gardens, urban areas, ponds, irrigated land, canals and ditches, and introduced vegetation.
