= Namaqua caco =

Conservation status
- Least Concern (IUCN 3.1)

Scientific classification
- Kingdom: Animalia
- Phylum: Chordata
- Class: Amphibia
- Order: Anura
- Family: Pyxicephalidae
- Genus: Cacosternum
- Species: C. namaquense

Binomial name
- Cacosternum namaquense Werner, 1910

Species of amphibian

The Namaqua caco or Namaqua dainty frog (Cacosternum namaquense) is a species of frog in the family Pyxicephalidae found in Namibia and South Africa. Its natural habitats are subtropical or tropical dry shrubland, intermittent rivers, intermittent freshwater marshes, freshwater springs, and rocky areas. It is threatened by habitat loss.
