= Tomopterna luganga =

Conservation status
- Least Concern (IUCN 3.1)

Scientific classification
- Kingdom: Animalia
- Phylum: Chordata
- Class: Amphibia
- Order: Anura
- Family: Pyxicephalidae
- Genus: Tomopterna
- Species: T. luganga

Binomial name
- Tomopterna luganga Channing, Moyer, and Dawood, 2004

Species of amphibian

Tomopterna luganga is a species of frog in the family Pyxicephalidae. It is endemic to central Tanzania where it is widespread. However, because the limits of its distribution are not well-mapped and suitable habitat extends to Kenya, it is possible that its range extends to that country. Common name red sand frog has been coined for it.

== Description ==
Males measure 39–47 mm (1.5–1.9 in) and females 37–52 mm (1.5–2.0 in) in snout–vent length. The tympanum is visible. The body is robust with short, stocky limbs. The fingers are tapered and have no terminal discs. The hind limbs are short and have reduced webbing. Skin is dorsally smooth but has small flat rounded warts. In breeding individuals, the dorsal colouration is predominantly reddish orange with dark red warts. There is a broad pale tan dorsolateral band that runs from a pale occipital botch behind the eye backwards to the hind limbs. The flanks are speckled with black on white; the ventrum is white.

The male advertisement call is a series of notes, with the first harmonic dominant at 1.05–1.17 kHz. The notes are sometimes uttered singly, sometimes together in a regularly spaced series that may have even 11 notes.

== Habitat and conservation ==
Tomopterna luganga occur in moist and drier savanna habitats at elevations up to 1,500 m (4,900 ft) above sea level. They require soils suitable for burrowing. Males call along pool edges and from shallow running sandy streams.

No significant threats to this species are known. It is known from several protected areas. It is present in the pet trade, but not in numbers that would impact the species.
