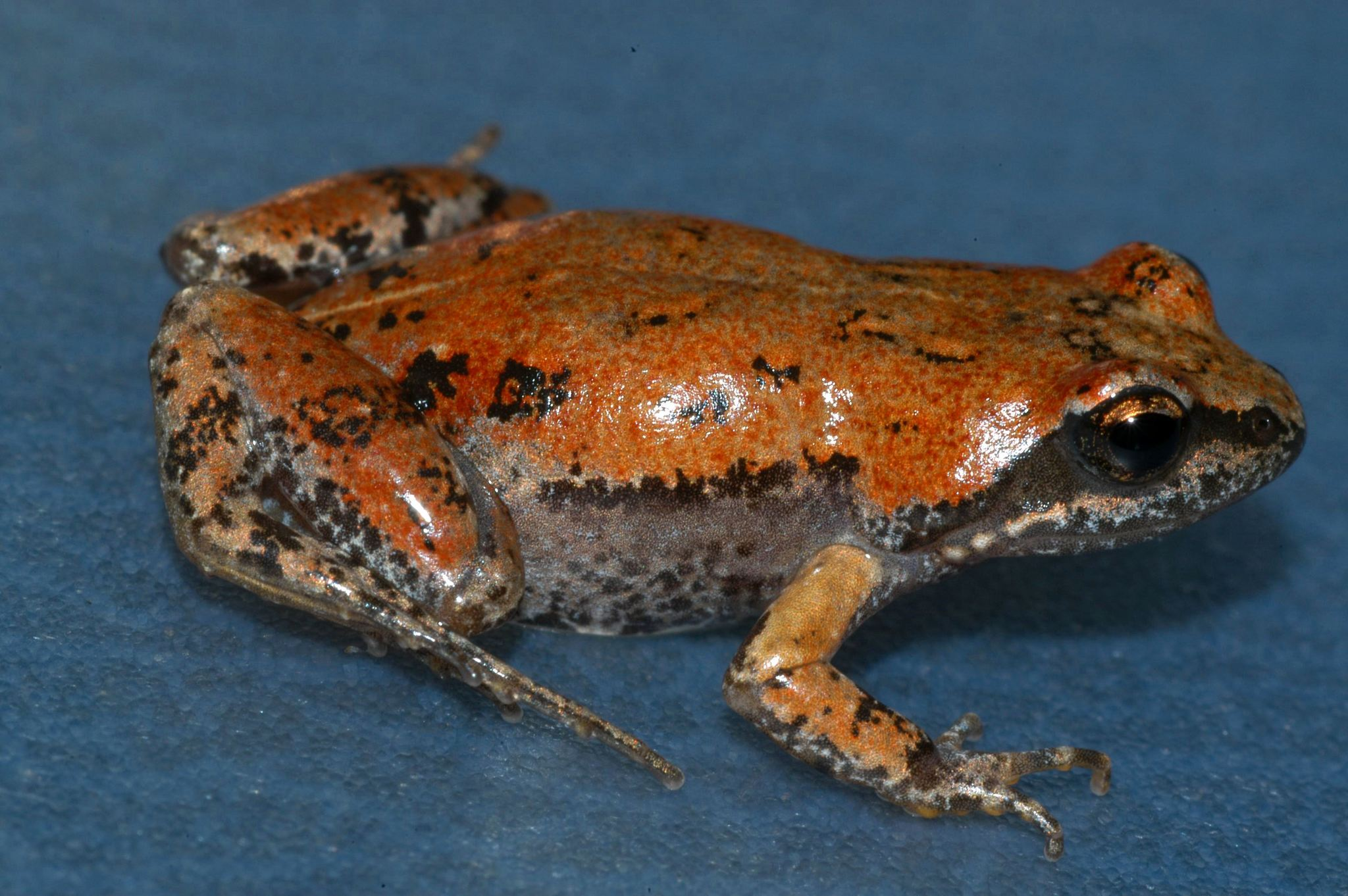

Conservation status
- Least Concern (IUCN 3.1)

Scientific classification
- Kingdom: Animalia
- Phylum: Chordata
- Class: Amphibia
- Order: Anura
- Family: Pyxicephalidae
- Genus: Cacosternum
- Species: C. nanum

Binomial name
- Cacosternum nanum Boulenger, 1887

Synonyms
- Cacosternum boettgeri albiventer Hewitt, 1926; Cacosternum magnaglandiferus Inger, 1959; Cacosternum poyntoni Lambiris, 1988

= Bronze caco =

Species of amphibian

The bronze caco (Cacosternum nanum), or bronze dainty frog, is a species of frog in the family Pyxicephalidae found in South Africa, Eswatini, Lesotho, and possibly Mozambique.

Cacosternum nanum is one of the most common frogs in its range. It occurs in a wide range of habitats, including fynbos heathland, savanna, shrubland, grassland, farmland, plantations, rural grassland, degraded forest, and urban areas. They aestivate below the surface or under logs and stones during dry periods, and may emerge in large numbers after heavy rain.
