= Marbled frog (disambiguation) =

The marbled frog (Limnodynastes convexiusculus) is a species of ground-dwelling frog in the family Myobatrachidae native to northern and north-eastern Australia, and southern New Guinea.

Marbled frog may also refer to:

- Marbled balloon frog (Uperodon systoma), a frog in the family Microhylidae found in Pakistan, India, Nepal, and Sri Lanka
- Marbled poison frog (Epipedobates boulengeri), a frog in the family Dendrobatidae found in western Colombia and northwestern Ecuador
- Marbled pygmy frog (Microhyla pulchra), a frog in the family Microhylidae found in northeastern India, southern China, and Southeast Asia
- Marbled rain frog (Scaphiophryne marmorata), a frog in the family Microhylidae endemic to Madagascar
- Marbled reed frog (Hyperolius marmoratus), a frog in the family Hyperoliidae found in Malawi, Mozambique, South Africa, Eswatini, and Zimbabwe, and Botswana, Lesotho, and Tanzania
- Marbled robber frog (Pristimantis marmoratus), a frog in the family Craugastoridae found in Brazil, French Guiana, Guyana, Suriname, Venezuela, possibly Colombia, and possibly Peru
- Marbled rubber frog (Phrynomantis annectens), a frog in the family Microhylidae found in Angola, Namibia, and South Africa
- Marbled sand frog (Tomopterna marmorata), a frog in the family Pyxicephalidae found in Botswana, Kenya, Malawi, Mozambique, South Africa, Zambia, and Zimbabwe, and possibly Namibia, Eswatini, and Tanzania
- Marbled shovelnose frog (Hemisus marmoratus), a frog in the family Hemisotidae, a frog found in Sub-Saharan Africa
- Marbled slender frog (Hylarana macrodactyla), a frog in the family Ranidae found in Cambodia, China, Hong Kong, Laos, Malaysia, Myanmar, Thailand, and Vietnam
- Marbled streamlined frog (Nannophrys marmorata), a frog in the family Dicroglossidae endemic to Sri Lanka
- Marbled sucker frog (Amolops marmoratus), a frog in the family Ranidae found in Myanmar and likely from northern Thailand, and possibly China and South Asian countries
