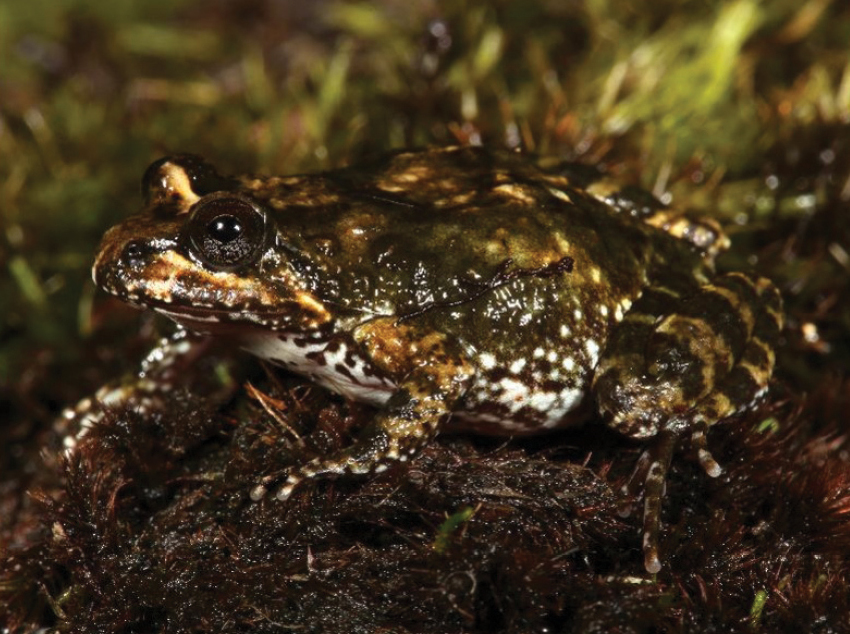
- Nothophryne broadleyi frog

Conservation status
- Endangered (IUCN 3.1)

Scientific classification
- Kingdom: Animalia
- Phylum: Chordata
- Class: Amphibia
- Order: Anura
- Family: Pyxicephalidae
- Genus: Nothophryne; Poynton, 1963
- Species: N. broadleyi

Binomial name
- Nothophryne broadleyi Poynton, 1963

= Nothophryne broadleyi =

Species of amphibian

Nothophryne broadleyi (common name: Broadley's mountain frog, mongrel frog) is a species of frog in the family Pyxicephalidae found on Mount Mulanje (Malawi). It was monotypic within the genus Nothophryne until four new species were described in 2018.

It is threatened by habitat loss caused by subsistence agriculture and extraction of wood. Also fires and invading exotic pines are threats.

== Distribution and habitat ==
Nothophryne broadleyi is endemic to the mountains of southeastern Malawi where the mountains rise abruptly from the surrounding plain. Its altitude range is between about 1,200 and 3,000 m (3,900 and 9,800 ft). It is abundant on Mount Mulanje in Malawi. It occurs in rocky areas in both montane forest and grassland.

== Ecology ==
Nothophryne broadleyi breeds on wet rocks beside mountain streams. The eggs are laid on the soaked moss, and the young frogs eventually disperse across the rocks.

== Status ==
The total area of occupation of this species is less than 5,000 square kilometres (1,900 sq mi), and it is known from fewer than five locations in total. The quality and extent of suitable habitat in the forests on Mount Mulanje is declining as wood is extracted from the forest and the land converted to subsistence farming. Other threats faced by the frogs are forest fires, and the planting of pine trees. The pines recover more quickly after a fire and gradually edge out the native vegetation. Populations of this frog are thought to be declining. For all these reasons, the International Union for Conservation of Nature has assessed this frog's conservation status as "endangered".
