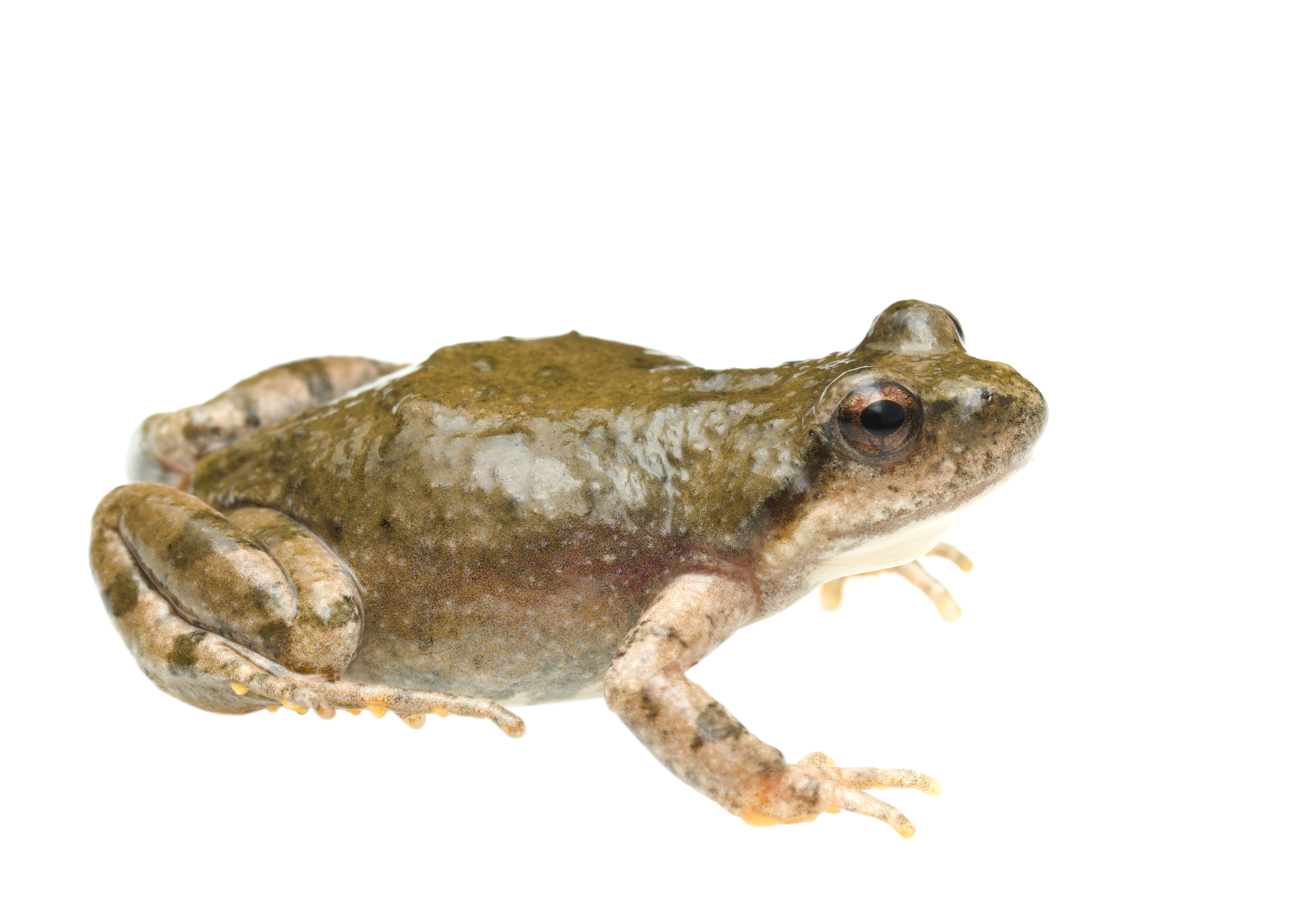

Conservation status
- Least Concern (IUCN 3.1)

Scientific classification
- Kingdom: Animalia
- Phylum: Chordata
- Class: Amphibia
- Order: Anura
- Family: Pyxicephalidae
- Genus: Cacosternum
- Species: C. karooicum

Binomial name
- Cacosternum karooicum Boycott, de Villiers & Scott, 2002

= Karoo dainty frog =

Species of amphibian

The Karoo dainty frog (Cacosternum karooicum) is a species of frog in the family Pyxicephalidae. It is endemic to South Africa. Its natural habitats are subtropical or tropical dry shrubland, intermittent rivers, intermittent freshwater marshes, rocky areas, and ponds.
