= Aubria subsigillata =

Brown ball frog

Conservation status
- Least Concern (IUCN 3.1)

Scientific classification
- Kingdom: Animalia
- Phylum: Chordata
- Class: Amphibia
- Order: Anura
- Family: Pyxicephalidae
- Genus: Aubria
- Species: A. subsigillata

Binomial name
- Aubria subsigillata (Duméril, 1856)
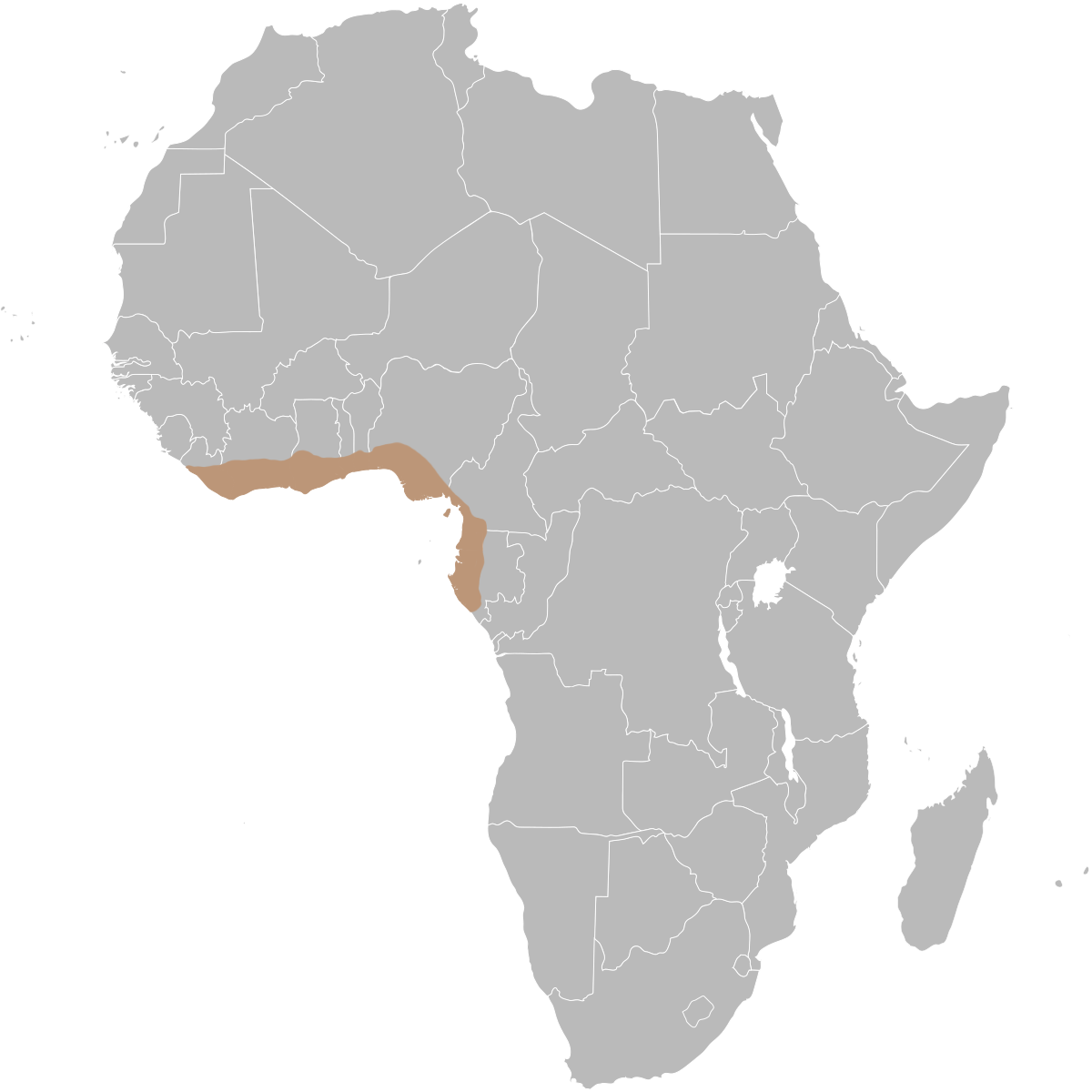

Synonyms
- Rana subsigillata Duméril, 1856; Aubrya subsigillata (incorrect spelling); Phrynopsis ventrimaculata Nieden, 1908; Leptodactylodon ventrimaculata (Nieden, 1908); Rana (Aubria) subsigillata Duméril, 1856; Aubria occidentalis Perret, 1995 "1994"

Species of amphibian

Aubria subsigillata, commonly known as the brown ball frog or the West African brown frog, is a species of frog belonging to the family Pyxicephalidae. It has a discontinuous distribution from southern Guinea through Liberia and Ivory Coast, and from Nigeria to southern Cameroon, and Equatorial Guinea to Gabon (with, at least apparently, a gap in Togo and Benin). However, the species delimitation differs between sources (see below), and the International Union for Conservation of Nature has adopted a narrower view where this species only occurs in Cameroon and southward.

== Taxonomy ==
The species currently known as A. subsigillata might represent more than one species. While the Amphibian Species of the World considers A. occidentalis as a synonym of A. subsigillata, other sources recognize it as a valid species. Furthermore, what some sources treat as Aubria occidentalis is actually another species, Aubria masako.

== Etymology ==
The specific name subsigillata is derived from Latin sub, meaning under, and sigillatus, for ornamented with small marks, in reference to the speckled underside of this species.

== Description ==
A. subsigillata is a large, stocky frog; males measure 65–88 mm (2.6–3.5 in) and females 76–95 mm (3.0–3.7 in) in snout–vent length. Apart from size, the males and females are quite similar. The dorsum is brown, whereas the underside is speckled white over a brown background; in older individuals, much of the underside is white. The tympanum is relatively small but visible.

== Habitat and conservation ==
Its natural habitats are swamps or along small streams in lowland rainforests, gallery forests, and degraded secondary habitats (farm bush) in the forest zone. It is an adaptable species that is likely to occur in many protected areas and unlikely to face significant threats.
