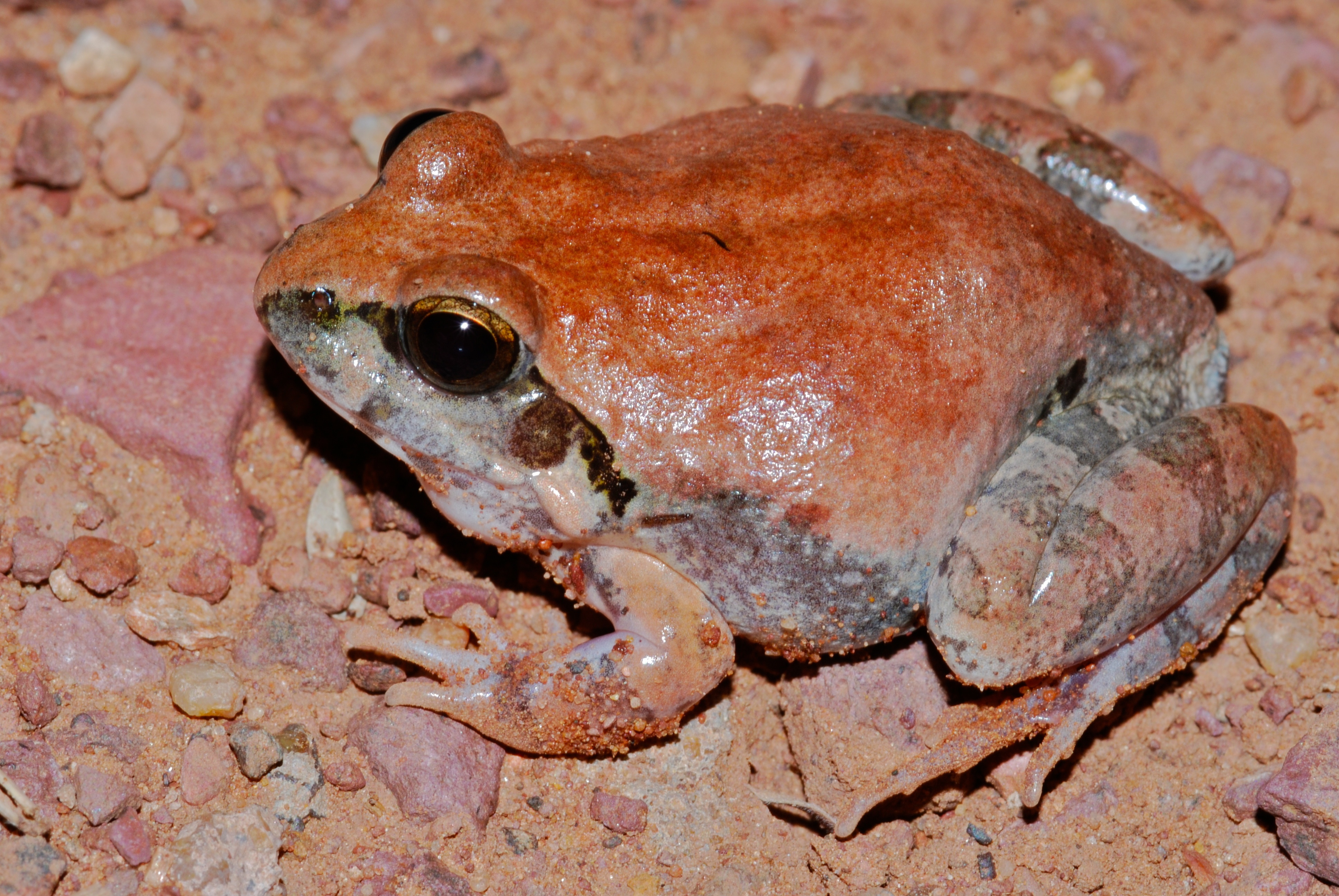

Conservation status
- Least Concern (IUCN 3.1)

Scientific classification
- Kingdom: Animalia
- Phylum: Chordata
- Class: Amphibia
- Order: Anura
- Family: Pyxicephalidae
- Genus: Tomopterna
- Species: T. natalensis

Binomial name
- Tomopterna natalensis (Smith, 1849)

= Natal sand frog =

Species of amphibian

The Natal sand frog (Tomopterna natalensis) is a species of frog in the family Pyxicephalidae. It is found in Mozambique, South Africa, and Eswatini, and possibly Botswana, Lesotho, and Zimbabwe. Its natural habitats are dry savanna, moist savanna, subtropical or tropical moist shrubland, temperate grassland, subtropical or tropical dry lowland grassland, subtropical or tropical high-altitude grassland, rivers, intermittent rivers, swamps, freshwater marshes, intermittent freshwater marshes, arable land, pastureland, and ponds.
