= Mountain caco =

Conservation status
- Least Concern (IUCN 3.1)

Scientific classification
- Kingdom: Animalia
- Phylum: Chordata
- Class: Amphibia
- Order: Anura
- Family: Pyxicephalidae
- Genus: Cacosternum
- Species: C. parvum

Binomial name
- Cacosternum parvum Poynton, 1963

Synonyms
- Cacosternum nanum ssp. parvum Poynton, 1963

Species of amphibian

The mountain caco or small dainty frog (Cacosternum parvum) is a frog species in the family Pyxicephalidae, found in Eswatini, Lesotho and South Africa. Its natural habitats are subtropical or tropical moist montane forest, subtropical or tropical seasonally wet or flooded lowland grassland, subtropical or tropical high-altitude grassland, rivers, intermittent rivers, swampland, freshwater marshes, intermittent freshwater marshes, pastureland, plantations, ponds, and canals and ditches.
