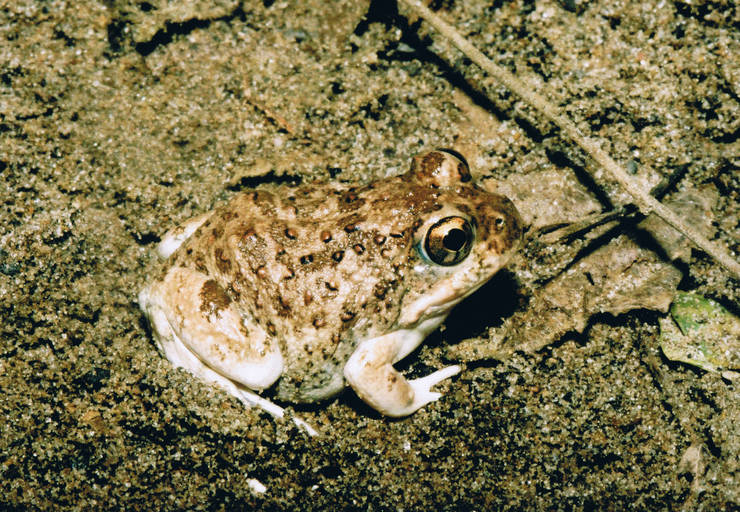
- Tandy's sand frog (Tomopterna tandyi)

Scientific classification
- Domain: Eukaryota
- Kingdom: Animalia
- Phylum: Chordata
- Class: Amphibia
- Order: Anura
- Family: Pyxicephalidae
- Subfamily: Cacosterninae
- Genus: Tomopterna; Duméril & Bibron, 1841

Type species
- Pyxicephalus delalandii Tschudi, 1838

= Tomopterna =

Genus of amphibians

Tomopterna (common names: sand frogs, burrowing frogs, Old World bullfrogs) is a genus of frogs from sub-Saharan Africa.

== Species ==
The following species are recognised in the genus Tomopterna:

- Tomopterna ahli (Deckert, 1938)
- Tomopterna branchi Wilson and Channing, 2019
- Tomopterna cryptotis (Boulenger, 1907) — common sand frog
- Tomopterna delalandii (Tschudi, 1838) — Delalande's sand frog
- Tomopterna elegans (Calabresi, 1927)
- Tomopterna gallmanni Wasonga & Channing, 2013
- Tomopterna kachowskii Nikolskii, 1900
- Tomopterna krugerensis Passmore & Carruthers, 1975 — knocking sand frog
- Tomopterna luganga Channing, Moyer & Dawood, 2004
- Tomopterna marmorata (Peters, 1854) — marbled sand frog
- Tomopterna milletihorsini (Angel, 1922)
- Tomopterna monticola (Fischer, 1884)
- Tomopterna natalensis (Smith, 1849) — Natal sand frog
- Tomopterna tandyi Channing & Bogart, 1996 — Tandy's sand frog
- Tomopterna tuberculosa (Boulenger, 1882) — rough sand frog
- Tomopterna wambensis Wasonga & Channing, 2013
