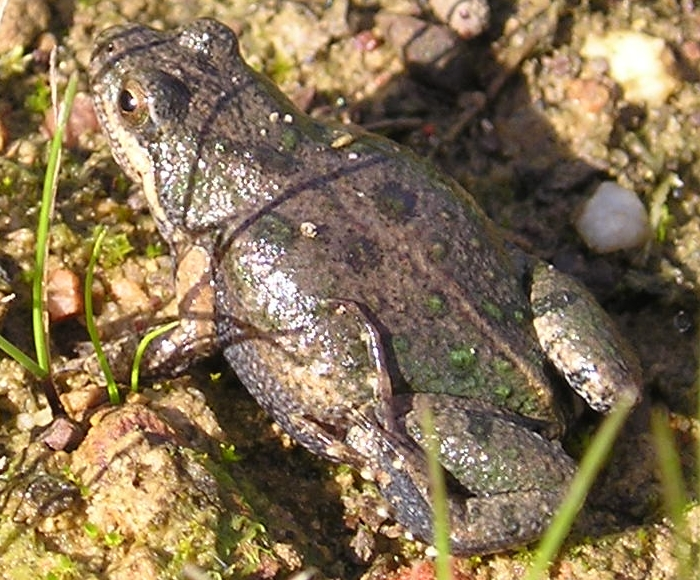
- Flat caco (Cacosternum platys)

Scientific classification
- Kingdom: Animalia
- Phylum: Chordata
- Class: Amphibia
- Order: Anura
- Family: Pyxicephalidae
- Subfamily: Cacosterninae
- Genus: Cacosternum; Boulenger, 1887

Species
- 16, see text.

= Cacosternum =

Genus of amphibians

Cacosternum is a genus of frog in the family Pyxicephalidae that are found in southern and eastern Africa. They have many common names, including cacos, dainty frogs, and metal frogs.

== Species ==
The genus contains 17 species:

- Cacosternum aggestum Channing, Schmitz, Burger, and Kielgast, 2013
- Cacosternum australis Channing, Schmitz, Burger, and Kielgast, 2013
- Cacosternum boettgeri (Boulenger, 1882) – Boettger's dainty frog
- Cacosternum capense Hewitt, 1925 – Cape caco
- Cacosternum cederbergense Angus, Telford, Ping, and Conradie, 2024
- Cacosternum karooicum Boycott, de Villiers, and Scott, 2002 – Karoo dainty frog
- Cacosternum kinangopensis Channing and Schmitz, 2009
- Cacosternum leleupi Laurent, 1950 – Katanga caco
- Cacosternum namaquense Werner, 1910 – Namaqua caco
- Cacosternum nanogularum Channing, Schmitz, Burger, and Kielgast, 2013
- Cacosternum nanum Boulenger, 1887 – bronze caco
- Cacosternum parvum Poynton, 1963 – mountain caco
- Cacosternum platys Rose, 1950 – flat caco
- Cacosternum plimptoni Channing, Brun, Burger, Febvre, and Moyer, 2005
- Cacosternum rhythmum Channing, Schmidtz, Burger, and Kielgast, 2013
- Cacosternum striatum FitzSimons, 1947 – striped caco
- Cacosternum thorini Conradie, 2014

Cacosternum poyntoni, Poynton's caco, is now considered a synonym of Cacosternum nanum.
