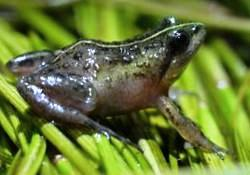

Conservation status
- Critically Endangered (IUCN 3.1)

Scientific classification
- Kingdom: Animalia
- Phylum: Chordata
- Class: Amphibia
- Order: Anura
- Family: Pyxicephalidae
- Subfamily: Cacosterninae
- Genus: Microbatrachella; Hewitt, 1926
- Species: M. capensis

Binomial name
- Microbatrachella capensis (Boulenger, 1910)

= Micro frog =

Species of amphibian

The micro frog (Microbatrachella capensis), or Cape Flats frog, is a species of frog less than 2 cm (0.8 in) long in the family Pyxicephalidae, in the monotypic genus Microbatrachella. Its color varies from rufous brown with dark mottling, to tan or green, depending on the population. It is endemic to the south-western Cape area of South Africa, with a single population found on the Cape Flats of Cape Town and several populations on the eastern side of False Bay. It typically lives in wetlands in coastal fynbos habitats, but its total area of occupancy is very small, and the International Union for Conservation of Nature has rated it as being "critically endangered".

== Description ==
The micro frog is a very small frog with a rounded snout and smooth skin. At around 18 mm (0.71 in) long, it is one of the smallest regional species. The dorsal surface is dark brown speckled with pale brown, and there is a pale band of color running down each flank. There is a dark bar between the eyes and a narrow pale line along the spine. The underparts are pale brown and the belly spotted with white.

== Distribution and habitat ==
The micro frog is endemic to the south-western Cape area of South Africa, with a single population found on the Cape Flats of Cape Town and a series of populations on the eastern side of False Bay, from Kogelberg to Cape Agulhas.

Its natural habitat is at low altitudes, in and around shallow, vegetated freshwater wetlands in coastal restioid fynbos, a Mediterranean-type vegetation dominated by restios (Cape reed). Typically, these wetlands have some areas of permanent water along with other areas inundated during the winter–spring rainy season.

== Behavior ==
The micro frog lives in wetlands in sandy, coastal fynbos, a type of heathland found in the Western Cape region of South Africa. It is associated with seepages and ephemeral pools, and depends on dark, acidic waters for breeding. The breeding season starts with the arrival of the rainy season, usually between July and September. Eggs are attached to the vegetation and the tadpoles develop slowly. During the dry season, these frogs bury themselves and aestivate.

== Status ==
This frog has a total area of occupancy of 7 km^{2} (2.7 mi^{2}), its distribution is severely fragmented, and the wetland habitat is being degraded, mainly threatened by drainage for coastal strip development. The International Union for Conservation of Nature has rated it as being "critically endangered".
