= Anna Merz =

English conservationist

- Born: Florence Ann Hepburn; 17 November 1931; Radlett, Hertfordshire, England
- Died: 4 April 2013 (aged 81); Melkrivier, South Africa
- Citizenship: United Kingdom
- Education: St Margaret's School, Bushey
- Alma mater: University of Nottingham; Lincoln's Inn
- Occupation: Conservationist
- Years active: 1958–1995
- Spouses: Ernest Kuhn (divorced) Karl Merz (died)
- Awards: Global 500 Roll of Honour (1990)

Anna Merz (née Hepburn; 17 November 1931 – 4 April 2013) was an English conservationist who established the Ngare Sergoi Rhino Sanctuary (now the Lewa Wildlife Conservancy) in 1983. She postponed her retirement in Kenya in 1976 to take up the task of saving black rhinoceroses from poachers wanting to slaughter them for their horns. In 1990, Merz was named to the Global 500 Roll of Honour by the United Nations Environment Programme. Following her death, a female rhinoceros calf was named Anna after her and two fictional books about Merz and a rhinoceros named Samia were published in the late 2010s.

== Early life ==
On 17 November 1931, Florence Ann Hepburn was born in Radlett, Hertfordshire, England, close to London, to a Chancery Court barrister who went on to become a High Court judge. As a child, she relocated between London and Cornwall during the Second World War. Merz was sent to a boarding school in Dorset with a farm and then to St Margaret's in Bushey. She resented St Margaret's and its underground air raid shelters; aged nine, her life was saved by someone she did not know when a German fighter plane attacked while she was on a beach. Merz studied economics and politics at the University of Nottingham before attending Lincoln's Inn to read for the bar.

== Career ==
She travelled extensively around the world. In 1958, Merz went to Ghana, where she operated a light industrial workshop as well as training and riding ponies and was honorary warden for the Ghanaian Game Department and National Park. She went to survey sites for wildlife reserves for the Ghanaian Game Department and National Park and was the manager of an animal orphanage. Merz went on exhibitions of Northern Kenya, the Sahara to seek suitable areas for reserves and Uganda.

In 1976, she postponed her retirement to take up the job of saving black rhinoceroses from poachers wanting to slaughter them for their horns to deal with Chinese and South East Asian demand from herbalists for herbicidal medicine and for Arabs to carve horns into dagger dangles at a vast rate. With a family inheritance of $750,000, Merz set up the Ngare Sergoi Rhino Sanctuary in 1983 from a lease of 5,000 acres (2,000 ha) of land from David Craig and his wife Delia Craig. She and the Craigs employed bush pilots, game-trackers and veterinarians to gather each of the wild rhinos in Northern Kenya to be bred and be kept safe. They also erected 42 mi (68 km) of 8 ft (96 in)-high 5,000 volt electric fencing to discourage potential poachers, recruited spies for information of poachers and purchased a plane for surveillance. Merz carried a gun and knife for protection. She and the Craigs hoped protecting the habitat, working with the community and providing the rhinos heavy security would enable them to breed enough so that they could repopulate Northern Kenya and the trio were give consent from the government.

One rhinoceros Merz was particularly fond of was an orphaned black rhinoceros named Samia that lived from 15 February 1985 to 21 November 1995. She adopted Samia as a baby and continued to rear her until it was six years old but Samia brought her calf to visit Merz daily. Merz was named to the Global 500 Roll of Honour by the United Nations Environment Programme in 1990. Throughout the 1990s, she expanded the sanctuary to 62,000 acres (25,000 ha) and renamed it the Lewa Wildlife Conservancy in 1995. Merz recruited local residents, for whom she built medical clinics and schools, and made the sanctuary open to tourists. She retired from Lewa soon after and moved to South Africa.

Merz became increasingly vocal in the rhinoceros movement and was a member of the San Diego Zoo's save-the-rhino initiative. She served on the board of both the International Rhino Foundation and the IUCN Asian Rhino Specialist Group. Merz agreed to be a patron of the Sebakwe Black Rhino Trust. She went on lecture tours across the United States, and authored works to raise awareness and funding about the rhinoceros. Merz wrote an account of her career with rhinoceros called Rhino: At the Brink of Extinction and described her formative life in England and work with the Ghanaian Game Department in the book Golden Dunes and Desert Mountains.

== Personal life ==
Merz disliked conducting public speeches to large groups of people because she preferred animals to humans. She was initially married to the Swiss industrial workshop owner Ernest Kuhn until their divorce in 1969. Her second marriage to Karl Merz lasted until his death in 1988. On 4 April 2013, Merz died in hospital in Melkrivier, South Africa. A memorial service was held for her at the Lewa Wildlife Conservancy on 12 May 2013.

== Legacy ==
According to Barbara A. Schreiber in Merz's entry in Encyclopædia Britannica, the conservationist "was a leading advocate for the preservation of rhinoceroses and one of the world's foremost authorities on the species." Following Merz's death, a female rhinoceros calf born in April 2013 was named Anna after the conservationist. A children's picture book by Daniel Kirk called Rhino In The House was published in early 2017 and features Merz and Samia. In 2019, an illustrated fictional book detailing how Merz rescued and looked after Samia in the rhinoceros' formative years called Anna & Samia: The True Story of Saving a Black Rhino was written by Paul Meisel.
