= Nothophryne =

Scientific classification
- Kingdom: Animalia
- Phylum: Chordata
- Class: Amphibia
- Order: Anura
- Family: Pyxicephalidae
- Subfamily: Cacosterninae
- Genus: Nothophryne; Poynton, 1963

Type species
- Nothophryne broadleyi Poynton, 1963

Genus of amphibians

Nothophryne is a genus of frogs known as mongrel frogs. They are found in southern Malawi and northern Mozambique. Until 2018, only one species in the genus was known, Nothophryne broadleyi. As of January 2019, there are five known species:

- Nothophryne baylissi Conradie, Bittencourt-Silva, Farooq, Loader, Menegon, and Tolley, 2018
- Nothophryne broadleyi Poynton, 1963
- Nothophryne inagoensis Conradie, Bittencourt-Silva, Farooq, Loader, Menegon, and Tolley, 2018
- Nothophryne ribauensis Conradie, Bittencourt-Silva, Farooq, Loader, Menegon, and Tolley, 2018
- Nothophryne unilurio Conradie, Bittencourt-Silva, Farooq, Loader, Menegon, and Tolley, 2018
