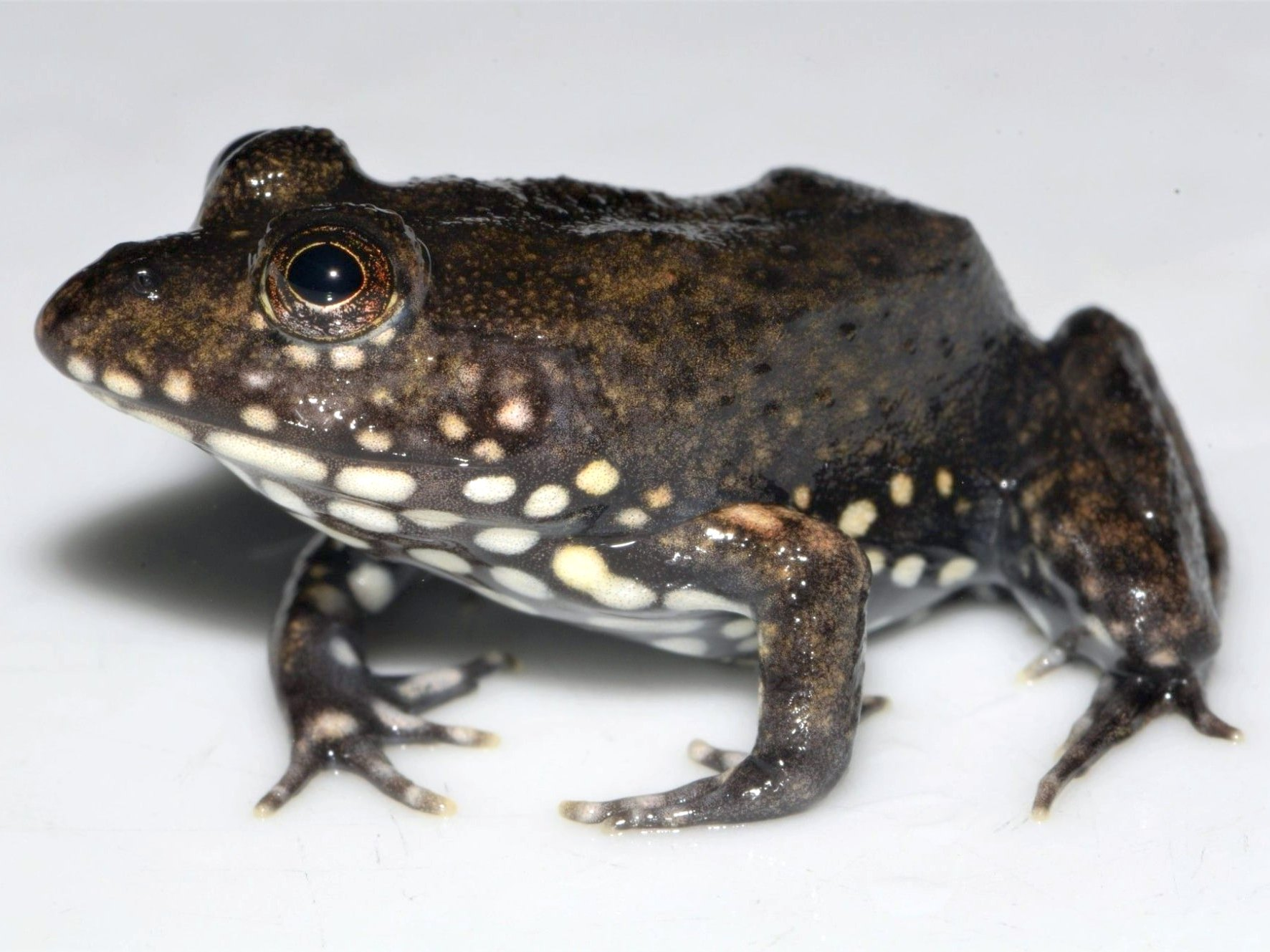
- Aubria masako

Scientific classification
- Domain: Eukaryota
- Kingdom: Animalia
- Phylum: Chordata
- Class: Amphibia
- Order: Anura
- Family: Pyxicephalidae
- Subfamily: Pyxicephalinae
- Genus: Aubria; Boulenger, 1917

Type species
- Rana subsigillata Duméril, 1856

= Aubria =

Genus of amphibians

Aubria is a small genus of frogs, with two (possibly three) known species. All members of this genus are found in West Africa. Their common name is ball frogs or fishing frogs.

== Etymology ==
The genus name Aubria is in honour of Charles Eugène Aubry-Lecomte, a French colonial administrator and amateur naturalist.

== Species ==
The recognized species are:

- Aubria masako (Ohler & Kazadi, 1990) - Masako fishing frog
- Aubria subsigillata (Duméril, 1856) - brown ball frog

The status of A. occidentalis is disputed; following the Amphibian Species of the World it is here treated as a synonym of A. subsigillata.
