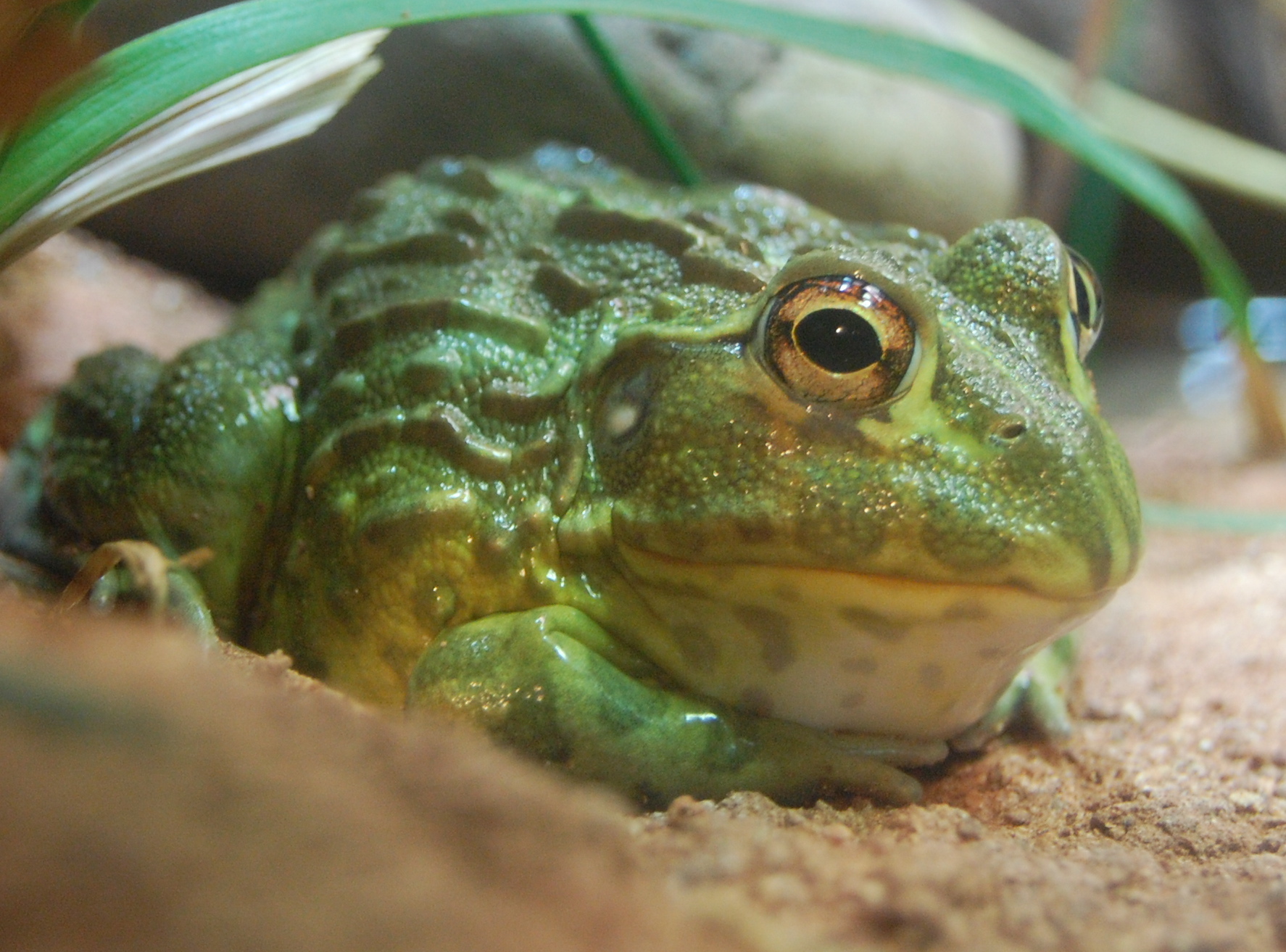
- Pyxicephalus adspersus

Scientific classification
- Domain: Eukaryota
- Kingdom: Animalia
- Phylum: Chordata
- Class: Amphibia
- Order: Anura
- Family: Pyxicephalidae
- Subfamily: Pyxicephalinae; Bonaparte, 1850

= Pyxicephalinae =

Pyxicephalinae Temporal range: Late Eocene to present

Subfamily of amphibians

Pyxicephalinae is a subfamily of frogs under the family Pyxicephalidae.

== Classification ==
Pyxicephalinae contains two genera, with a total of six species. One extinct genus is also known from the Eocene of Europe, with a debated number of species.

- Subfamily Pyxicephalinae
  - Genus Aubria Boulenger, 1917 - contains two species, the Masako fishing frog and the brown ball frog
  - Genus Pyxicephalus Tschudi, 1838 - contains four species of African bull frogs
  - Genus †Thaumastosaurus de Stefano, 1903 - contains two to five extinct species from the Eocene of Europe
