= Poyntonia =

Conservation status
- Near Threatened (IUCN 3.1)

Scientific classification
- Kingdom: Animalia
- Phylum: Chordata
- Class: Amphibia
- Order: Anura
- Family: Pyxicephalidae
- Genus: Poyntonia; Channing & Boycott, 1989
- Species: P. paludicola

Binomial name
- Poyntonia paludicola Channing & Boycott, 1989

Genus of amphibians

Poyntonia, is a monotypic frog genus in the family Pyxicephalidae. It was named after J.C. Poynton, a notable herpetologist who worked in southern Africa.

Poyntonia paludicola, commonly known as the Montane Marsh frog, is the sole member of the genus. It is endemic to the Western Cape province, South Africa. Populations have been recorded in the Kogelberg, Hottentots-Holland, and Klein River mountains at the elevations of 0–1,800 m (0–5,906 ft) asl. Despite occurring as relatively fragmented populations across its range, it is locally abundant in suitable habitat and is presumably philopatric. It is possible that the separate populations represent cryptic species, but this has to be investigated.

Breeding related aggression between males in P. paludicola

== Description ==
P. paludicola resemble bufonids due to their stout form and warty appearance. Adults attain a length of 27 - 30mm, with females being larger than males. The tympanum is not visible. Fingers have slight webbing. Toes are long without discs. Warts cover most of the body. A raised mass of warty skin is present behind each eye. Individuals often have a red-orange vertebral stripe. A long white teardrop-like mark extends from the bottom of the eye towards the top of the arm, in most individuals. The belly is pale, often with dark blotches unevenly distributed.

The advertisement call consists of 1-6 brief, low-pitched chirps at a rate of about 3 per second. It is a unique, coarse "kruck-kruck-kruck".

Eggs are relatively large compared to the size of the adults. One clutch laid in September 2020 contained 15 eggs which were deposited at the edge of a seepage pool in 2 cm of muddy water. Regarding morphology and relative size of eggs and larva, Poyntonia shares many similarities with Capensibufo, a genus of small montane toads utilizing similar habitat and occurring in sympatry.

== Habitat ==
P. paludicola inhabits montane fynbos (Mediterranean-type shrubby vegetation) in areas with high rainfall (2,000-3,000 mm per year) from sea level to 1800 msl. These frogs breed in shallow puddles associated with seepage areas. Often there is some level of waterflow within the seepage. Threats to the species habitat include the encroachment of alien vegetation, water abstraction, and the disturbance of natural fire regimes. Most populations occur within protected areas, such as the Kogelberg Biosphere Nature Reserve, Hottentots Holland Nature Reserve, and Fernkloof Nature Reserve.

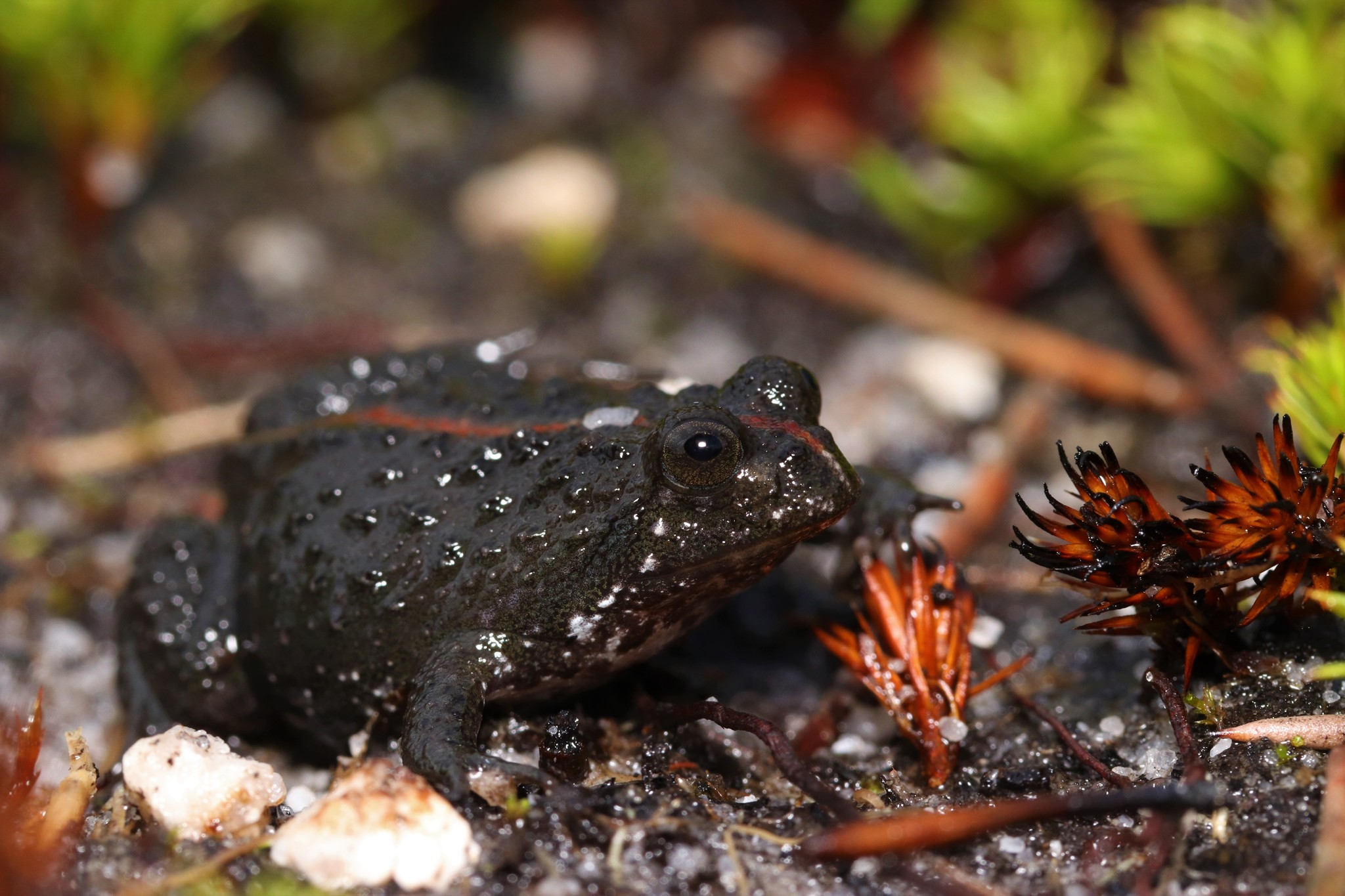
An adult Poyntonia paludicola from Jonkershoek Nature Reserve.

== Life history ==
The majority of breeding is assumed to take place within the winter months, from June–September, although males will call at anytime of the year if weather conditions are appropriate. This species is diurnal, and individuals of all life stages can be found during the day, often in exposed positions within seepages. Males will start calling at sunrise and continue into the evening. Egg clutches have been found in very shallow pools under a thin layer of mud. Larvae are benthic, and will hide within the mud when disturbed.

Breeding does not seem to be greatly affected by fire, as calls have been heard after the first good rains following a fire. Additionally, this species can tolerate some level of anthropogenic disturbance. Individuals have been found in eroded areas or drainage ditches on the side of jeep tracks which cut through their seepage areas. Breeding related aggression between males has been recorded, similar to combat observed in African Bullfrogs.
