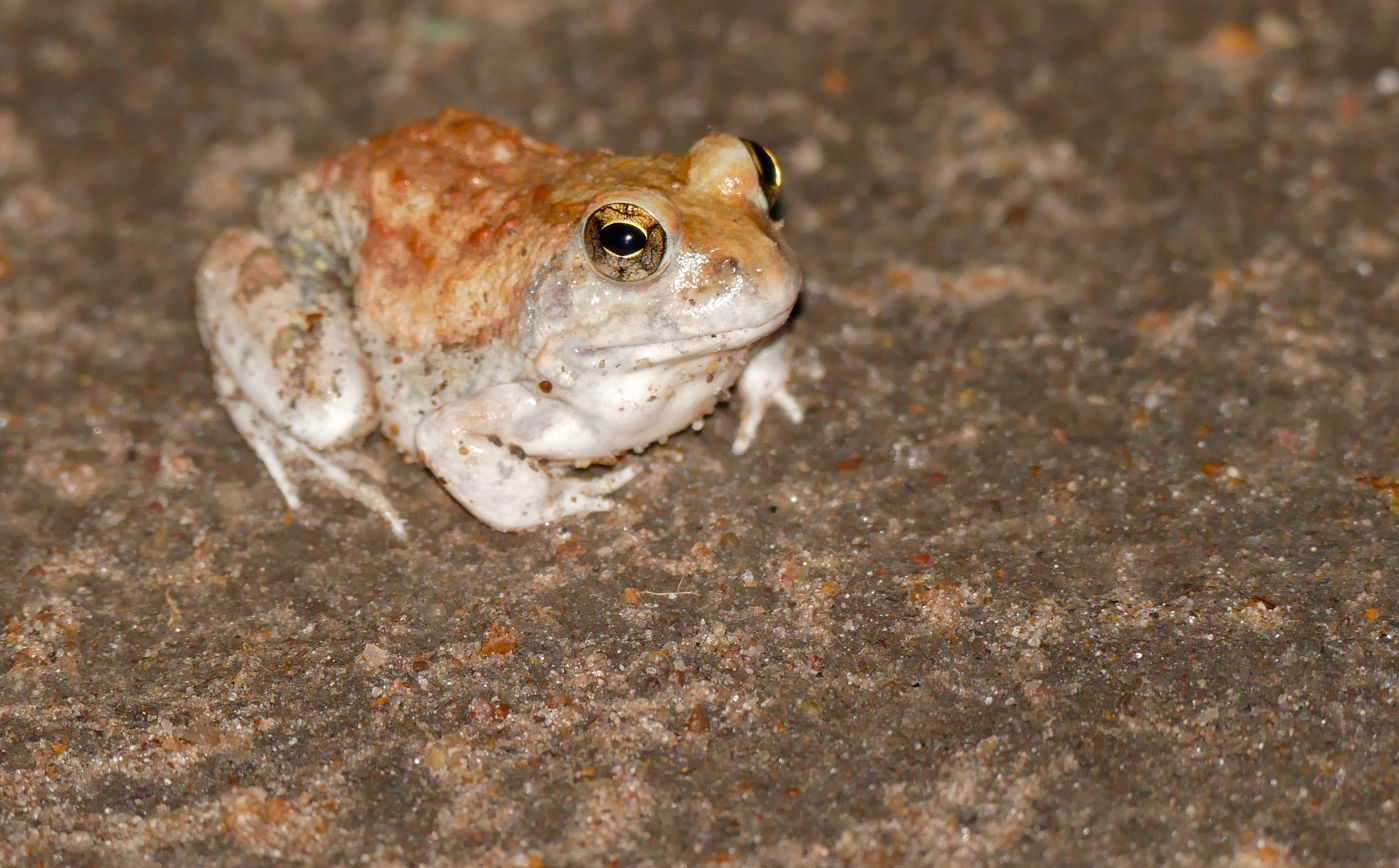

Conservation status
- Least Concern (IUCN 3.1)

Scientific classification
- Kingdom: Animalia
- Phylum: Chordata
- Class: Amphibia
- Order: Anura
- Family: Pyxicephalidae
- Genus: Tomopterna
- Species: T. marmorata

Binomial name
- Tomopterna marmorata (Peters, 1854)

= Marbled sand frog =

Species of amphibian

The marbled sand frog (Tomopterna marmorata) is a species of frog in the family Pyxicephalidae that is native to East and southern Africa.

== Range ==
It is found in Botswana, Kenya, Malawi, Mozambique, South Africa, Zambia, and Zimbabwe, and possibly Namibia, Eswatini, and Tanzania.

== Habitat ==
Its natural habitats are dry savanna, moist savanna, subtropical or tropical dry shrubland, subtropical or tropical moist shrubland, rivers, intermittent rivers, intermittent freshwater lakes, freshwater marshes, intermittent freshwater marshes, arable land, pastureland, water storage areas, and ponds.
