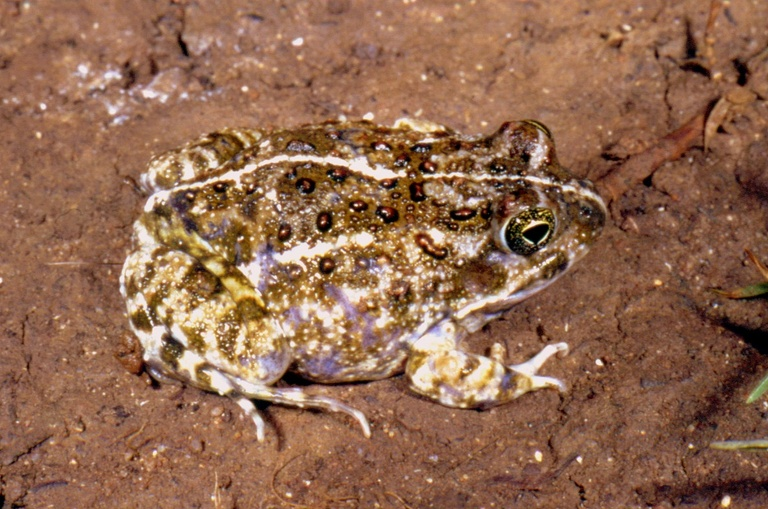

Conservation status
- Least Concern (IUCN 3.1)

Scientific classification
- Kingdom: Animalia
- Phylum: Chordata
- Class: Amphibia
- Order: Anura
- Family: Pyxicephalidae
- Genus: Tomopterna
- Species: T. delalandii

Binomial name
- Tomopterna delalandii (Tschudi, 1838)

Synonyms
- Pyxicephalus Delalandii Tschudi, 1838; Bombinator Delalandii Tschudi, 1838; Rana delalandii (Tschudi, 1838); (incomplete list)

= Delalande's sand frog =

Species of amphibian

Delalande's sand frog (Tomopterna delalandii), also known as Delalande's frog, Cape sand frog, or striped pixie, is a species of frog in the family Pyxicephalidae. It is endemic to western and southern South Africa and occurs in the low-lying areas of Namaqualand, Western Cape, and Eastern Cape as far east as Cape St. Francis.

== Etymology ==
The specific name delalandii honours Pierre Antoine Delalande, a French explorer and naturalist who collected in the Cape area in 1818.

== Description ==
Tomopterna delalandii is a robust-bodied species with toad-like appearance and gait. Females can reach 50 mm (2.0 in) in snout–vent length. The head is broad and the eyes are large and bulging. The legs are relatively short. There are no finger or toe discs but the toes have some webbing. The upper parts vary in colouration from light grey to dark brown, usually with a mottled appearance and a pale patch between the shoulders. There is also usually a pale vertebral stripe, and often a pale stripe on either side of the body. Males have a dark throat.

The male advertisement call is a series of short ringing notes, with about 6–8 notes per second.

== Habitat and conservation ==
The species occurs in fynbos heath land and succulent karroo shrubland, and it can also live in agricultural land. Breeding takes place in both temporary and semi-permanent bodies of water found in pans, pools, vleis and dams, in flat, sandy areas. It is a very abundant species that occurs in several protected areas. It can be locally threatened by habitat loss caused by the spread of alien vegetation and agricultural and urban expansion.
