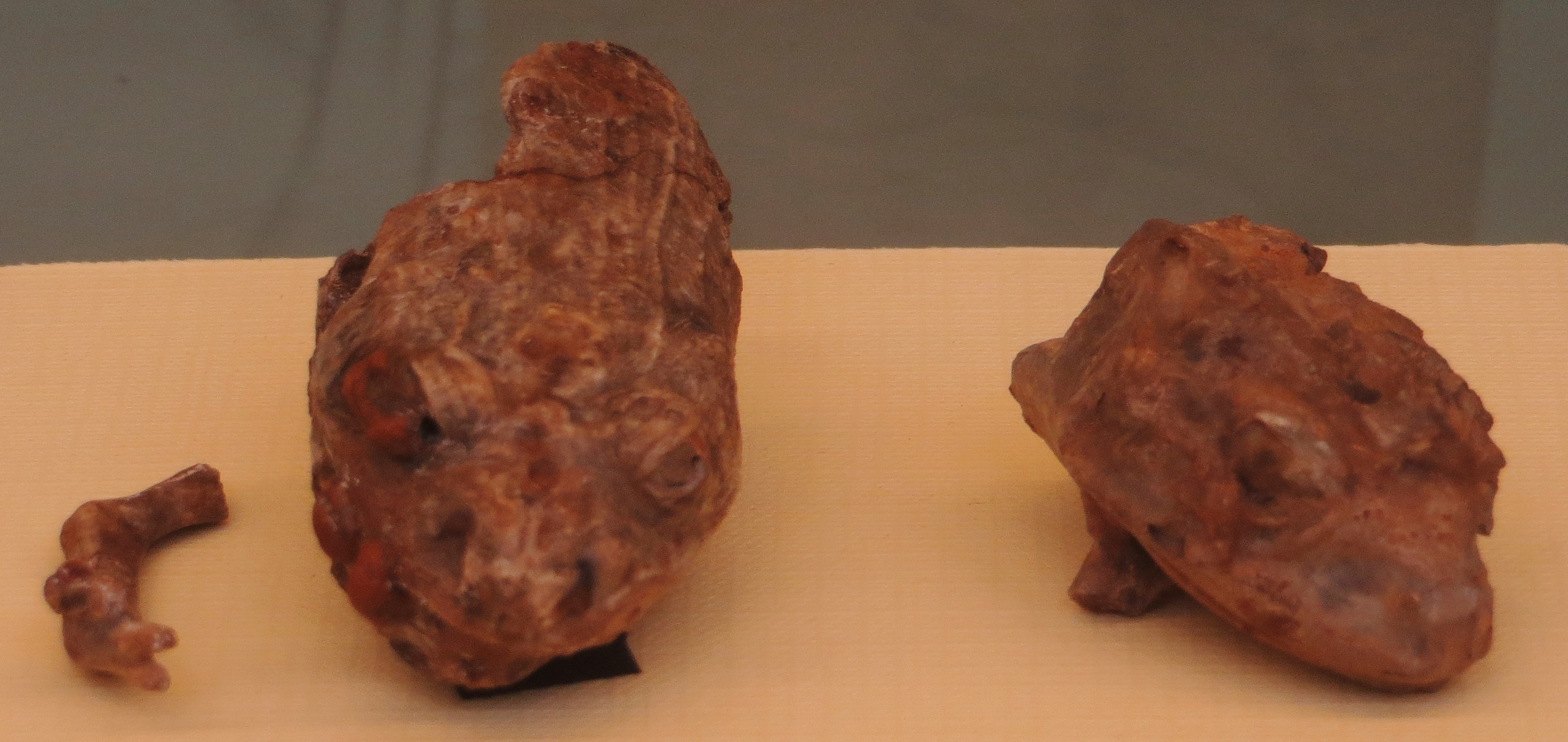
- "Mummified" specimens of T. gezei

Scientific classification
- Kingdom: Animalia
- Phylum: Chordata
- Class: Amphibia
- Order: Anura
- Family: Pyxicephalidae
- Subfamily: Pyxicephalinae
- Genus: †Thaumastosaurus de Stefano, 1903

Species
- T. botti De Stefano, 1903; T. gezei Rage and Roček, 2007; T. servatus (Filhol, 1876); T. sulcatus Holman and Harrison, 2003; T. wardi Holman and Harrison, 2002

Synonyms
- Enigmatosaurus Nopcsa, 1908

= Thaumastosaurus =

Thaumastosaurus Temporal range: Late Eocene, 40–34 Ma

Extinct genus of frogs

Thaumastosaurus ("marvelous lizard") is an extinct genus of frogs in the family Pyxicephalidae. Five species are known, all from the Eocene of western Europe, including France, England, and Switzerland. Specimens of the species T. gezei from the Quercy Phosphorites of France are known for their exceptional preservation, providing three-dimensional images of the animal's life appearance.

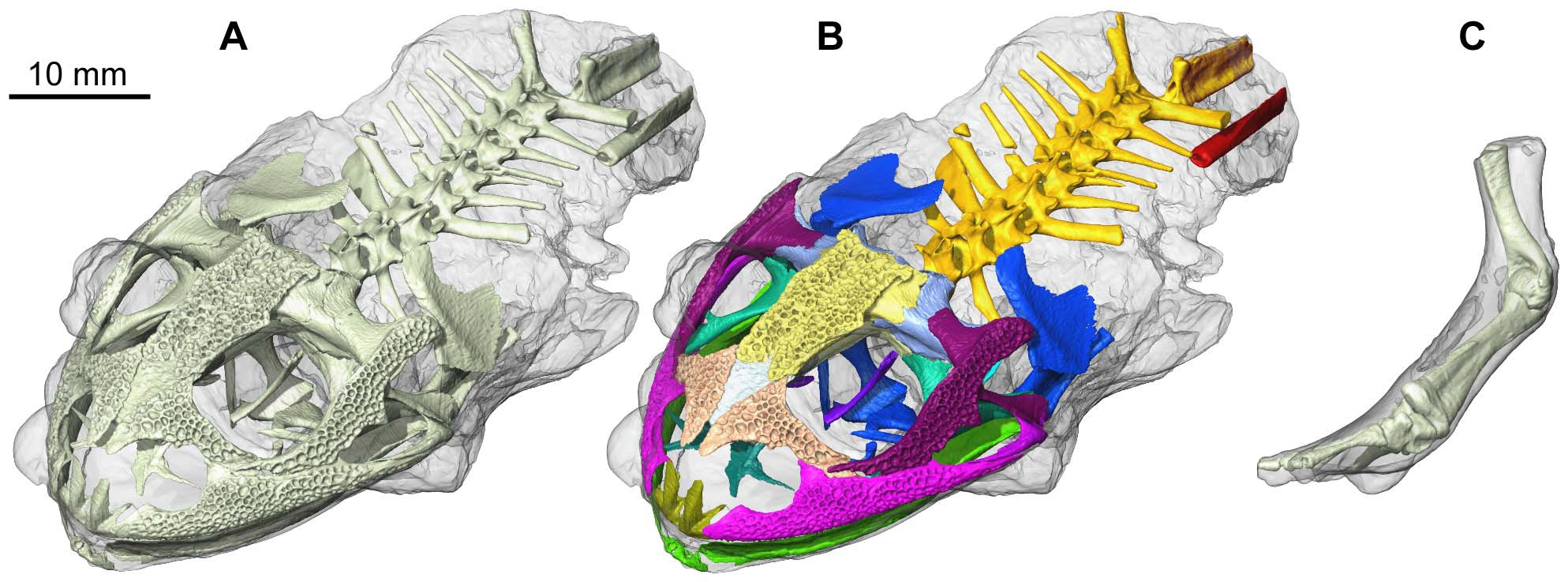
Internal scan of a Thaumastosaurus "mummy"

"Mummified" Thaumastosaurus specimens were first described in the 19th century, named "Rana" plicata (a name later found to be preoccupied, and later reclassified as T. gezei) and "Bufo" serratus (later amended to servatus). Fragmentary remains of a skull described in 1903 were confused for the anterior vertebra of a highly unusual lizard, hence the name Thaumastosaurus. Later analyses found "Thaumastosaurus" to be a frog, and assigned the mummified specimens to it. Other skeletal remains assigned to the genus were later found elsewhere in Europe.

Initially, based on comparative anatomy, Thaumastosaurus was classified within the superfamily Hyloidea, although this would be evolutionary improbable as the Hyloidea were largely restricted to the Americas at the time. More recent cranial analyses have found it to belong to the Pyxicephalidae, a family that contains several large frogs that are now found only in Africa, and specifically a stem-member of the subfamily Pyxicephalinae. This suggests that the ancestors of Thaumastosaurus evolved in Africa and dispersed to western Europe, then a tropical island group, during the early Paleogene. It may be related to Rocekophryne, a fossil frog known from the Eocene of Algeria. Thaumastosaurus appears to have gone extinct at the end of the Eocene, during the Eocene–Oligocene extinction event as the climate rapidly cooled. Afterwards, it was replaced by the modern ranid frog genus Pelophylax, which colonized Europe from Asia.

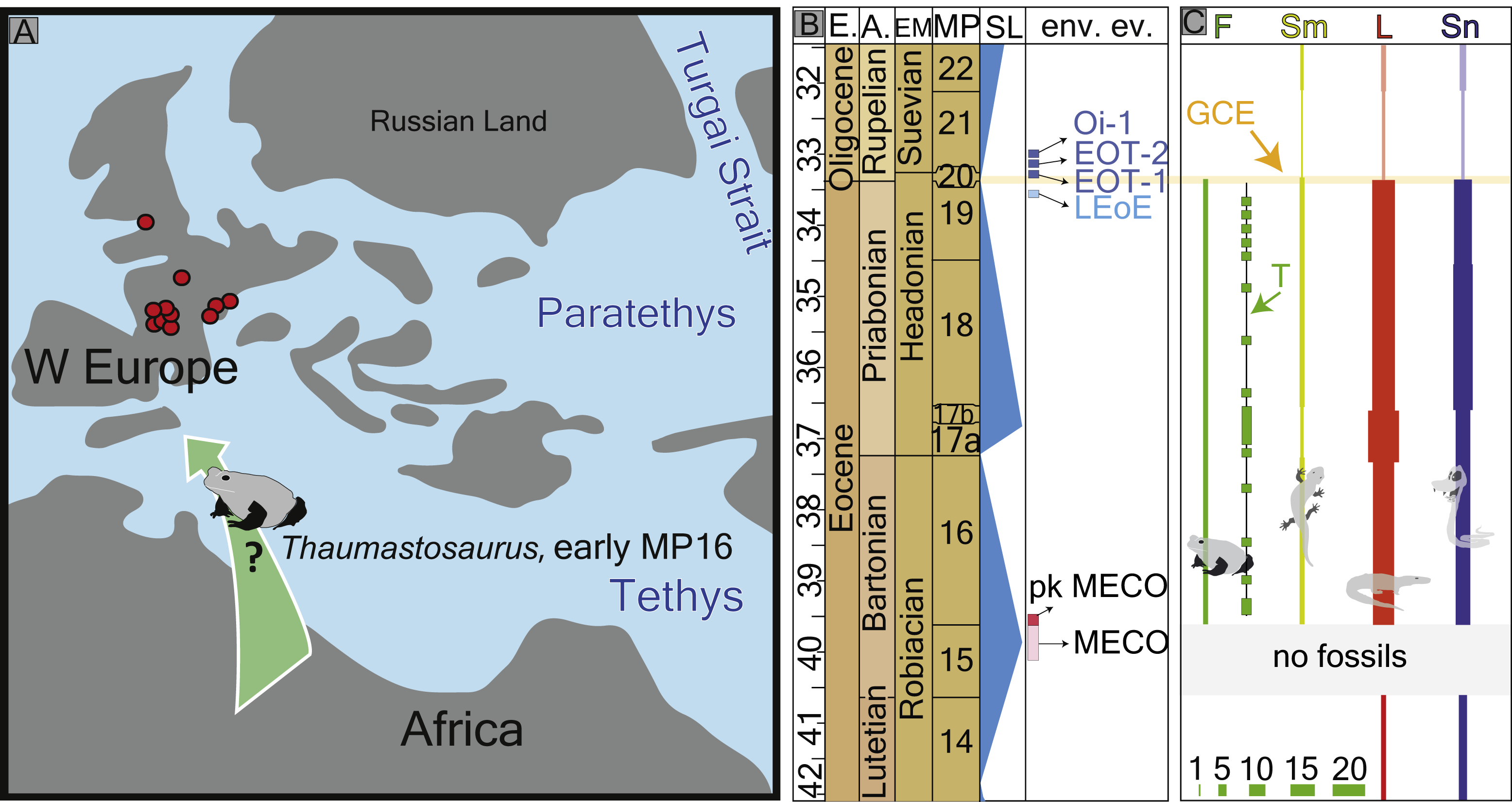
Distribution and stratigraphic occurrence of Thaumastosaurus

Five species are known, although some may be conspecific with one another:

- T. botti De Stefano, 1903 – Eocene of France and Switzerland (possibly synonymous with T. gezei)
- T. gezei Rage and Roček, 2007 – Eocene of France
- T. servatus (Filhol, 1876) – Eocene of France (likely synonymous with T. gezei)
- T. sulcatus Holman and Harrison, 2003 – Eocene of England
- T. wardi Holman and Harrison, 2002 – Eocene of England
