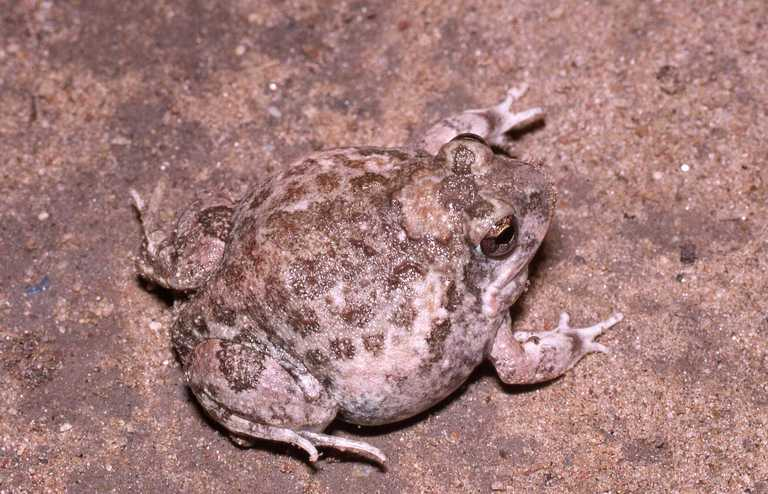

Conservation status
- Least Concern (IUCN 3.1)

Scientific classification
- Kingdom: Animalia
- Phylum: Chordata
- Class: Amphibia
- Order: Anura
- Family: Pyxicephalidae
- Genus: Tomopterna
- Species: T. cryptotis

Binomial name
- Tomopterna cryptotis (Boulenger, 1907)

= Common sand frog =

Species of amphibian

The common sand frog (Tomopterna cryptotis) is a species of frog in the family Pyxicephalidae. It is found in dryer (xeric) regions in sub-Saharan Africa. However, it is likely a cryptic species complex, and the distribution of the nominal Tomopterna cryptotis is poorly known. IUCN list the following countries: Angola, Botswana, Cameroon, Djibouti, Eritrea, Eswatini, Ethiopia, Kenya, Lesotho, Malawi, Mali, Mauritania, Mozambique, Namibia, Niger, Nigeria, Senegal, Somalia, South Africa, Sudan, Tanzania, Uganda, Zambia, Zimbabwe, and possibly Benin, Burkina Faso, Central African Republic, Chad, and Guinea.

Common sand frogs, as their name suggests, are common in suitable habitats. They inhabit areas with sandy soils along drainage lines in dry savanna, grassland and in semi-desert conditions. At higher altitudes they also inhabit montane grasslands. They breed in temporary pools, roadside puddles and oases.
