= Ngare Ndare Forest =

Coordinates: 0.14705°N 37.36429°E

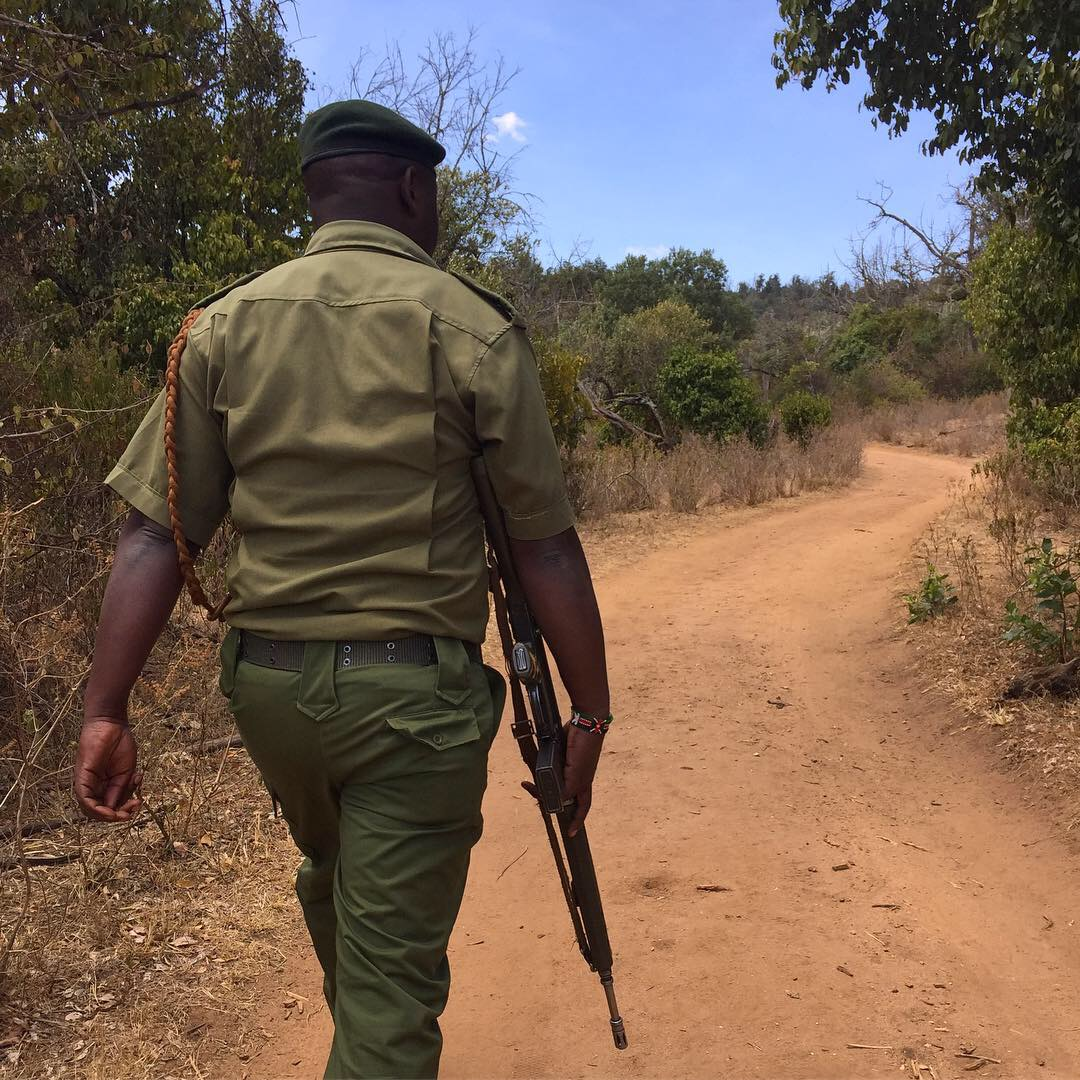
Ranger in Ngare Ndare Forest

Ngare Ndare Forest is a nature preserve in Meru County in Kenya's Eastern Province. It links Lewa Wildlife Conservancy with Mount Kenya forest preserve.

== Forest ==
Ngare Ndare Forest is a natural forest in the foothills north of Mount Kenya. The Ngare Ndare River flows through the forest and the preserve protects water resources for the region as well as an elephant corridor between Mount Kenya forest preserve and Lewa Wildlife Conservancy. A tunnel forms part of the elephant corridor. Wildlife includes a range of large animals plus colobus monkeys and more than 200 bird species. Together with Lewa Wildlife Conservancy, it is recognized as a UNESCO World Heritage Site.

The preserve is an ecotourism destination, offering swimming in natural pools fed by waterfalls, and wildlife observation from a 450-metre (1,480 ft) bridge in the tree canopy, the longest in East Africa. Tourists can camp on or below a wildlife observation platform mounted in a tree 7 metres (23 ft) off the ground. The preserve is administered by Ngare Ndare Forest Trust, formed in 2004, which organises tree planting, maintains the fence which was installed in the 1990s to minimise human–wildlife conflicts, and assists local communities with biogas cooking stoves, development funds from tourism, and employment.

Ngare Ndare means "water for the goats" in Maasai, but is often translated "waterfall of the gods".

== Ngare Ndare Farm ==
In the 1970s Ngare Ndare Farm was one of the properties of William Powys, a farmer and artist, and the American artist Robert Kuhn also painted there.
