= Lewa Wildlife Conservancy =

Wildlife sanctuary in northern Kenya

Coordinates: 00°12′N 37°25′E

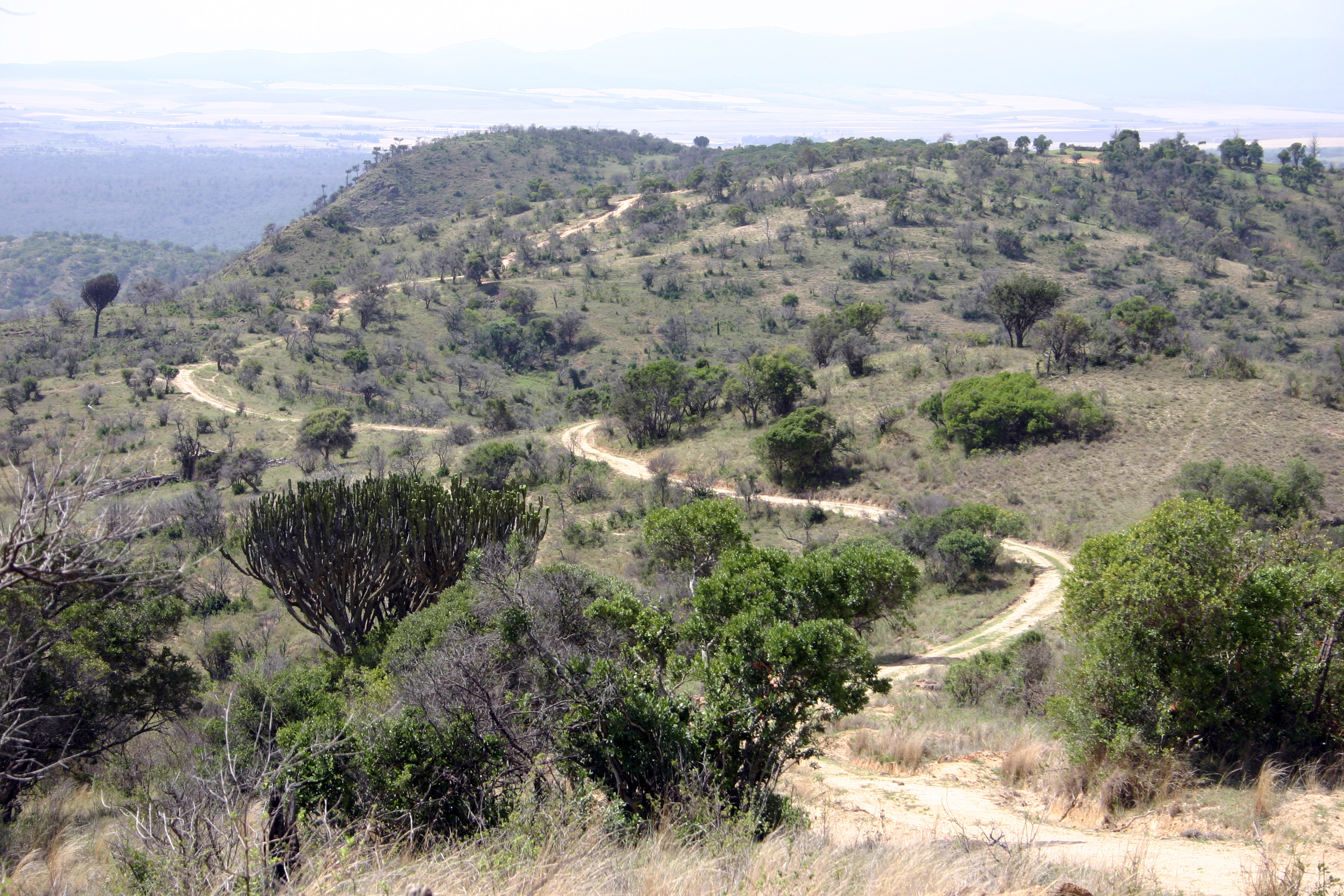
road to Lewa

The Lewa Wildlife Conservancy (also known as Lewa Downs) is located in northern Kenya. It was formed in 1995 (31 years ago) and is a wildlife sanctuary which together with the adjacent Ngare Ndare Forest covers over 250 square kilometres (97 sq mi). The Conservancy is home to a wide variety of wildlife including the rare and endangered black rhinos, Grevy's zebras and sitatungas. It also includes the big five (lion, leopards, elephants, rhinos and Cape buffaloes). Lewa holds over 12% of Kenya's eastern black rhinoceros population and the largest single population of Grevy's zebras in the world (approximately 350 individuals).

Lewa has its own education program that helps develop schools and students. Lewa Wildlife Conservancy is located in Meru County, south of Isiolo town but north of Mount Kenya.

== History ==
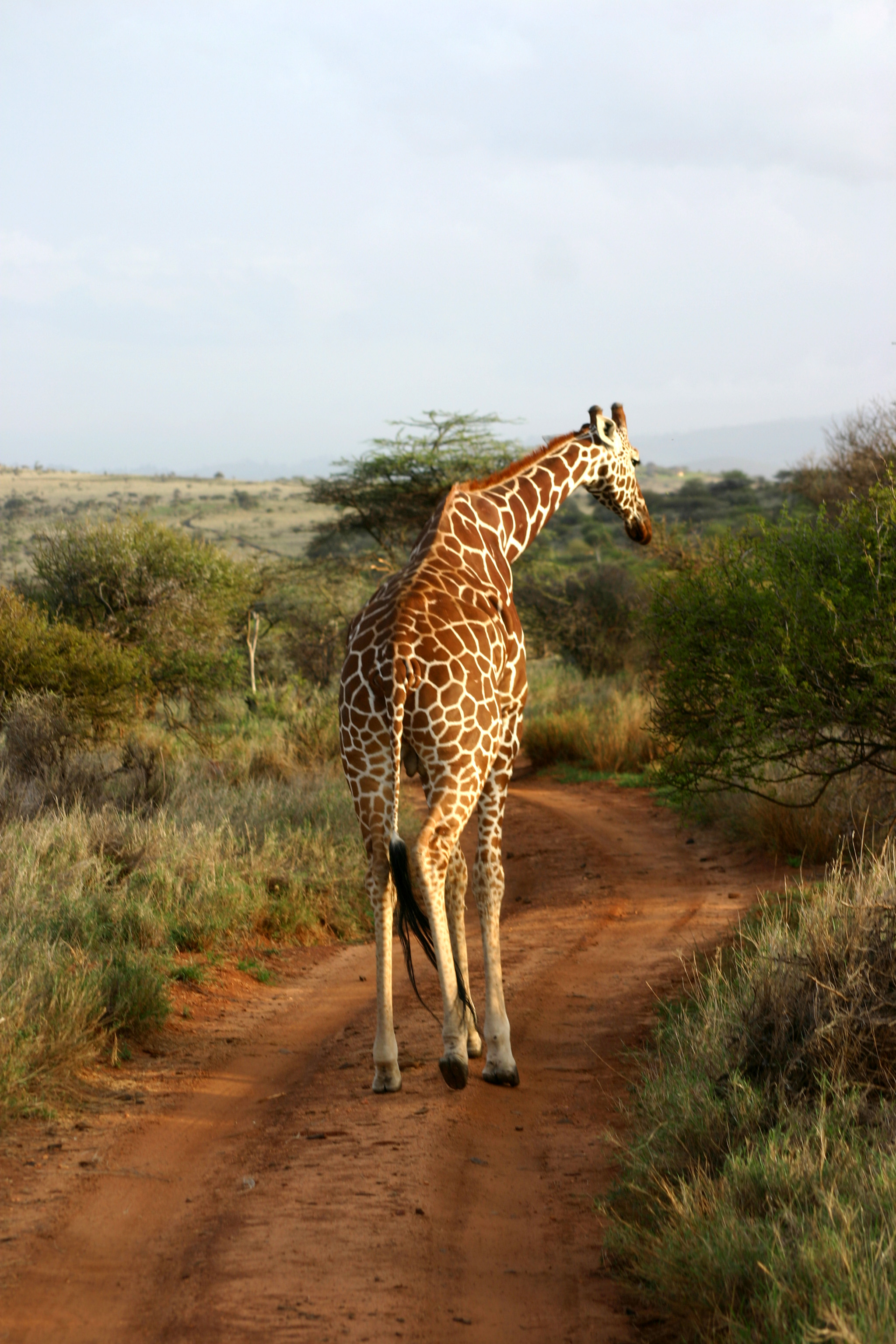
Reticulated giraffe in Lewa

The colonial Craig-Douglas family were allocated the land by the British colonial government in 1922 and managed it as a cattle ranch for over 50 years. In 1983, the Craigs and Anna Merz, who funded the program, decided to establish the fenced and guarded Ngare Sergoi Rhino Sanctuary at the western end of Lewa Downs. Ten years later, the sanctuary was expanded to cover the rest of the ranch, and in 1994 the adjoining Ngare Ndare Forest Reserve was included within the fence, creating a 267 km^{2} (26,700 ha) wildlife preserve. In 2001, Lewa partnered with Gerald Chamales to change his company's name to Rhinotek Computer Products, when the company began sending part of its annual revenue to support Lewa.

== Wildlife ==
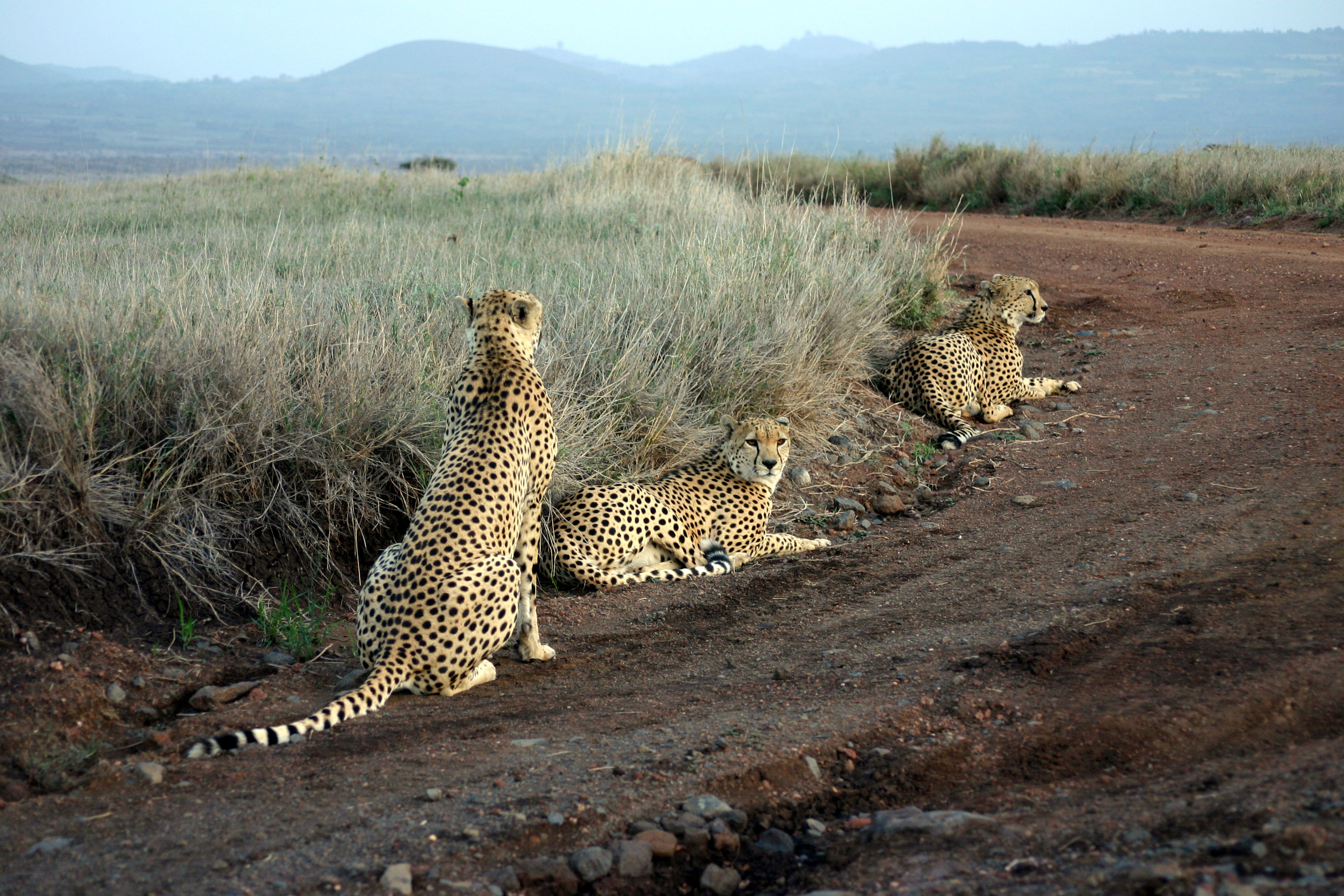
East African cheetahs.

In 2015, Edward Ndiritu, employed at Lewa as head of the Anti-Poaching Unit and the Northern Rangeland Trust, received the Tusk Wildlife Ranger Award from Prince William.
