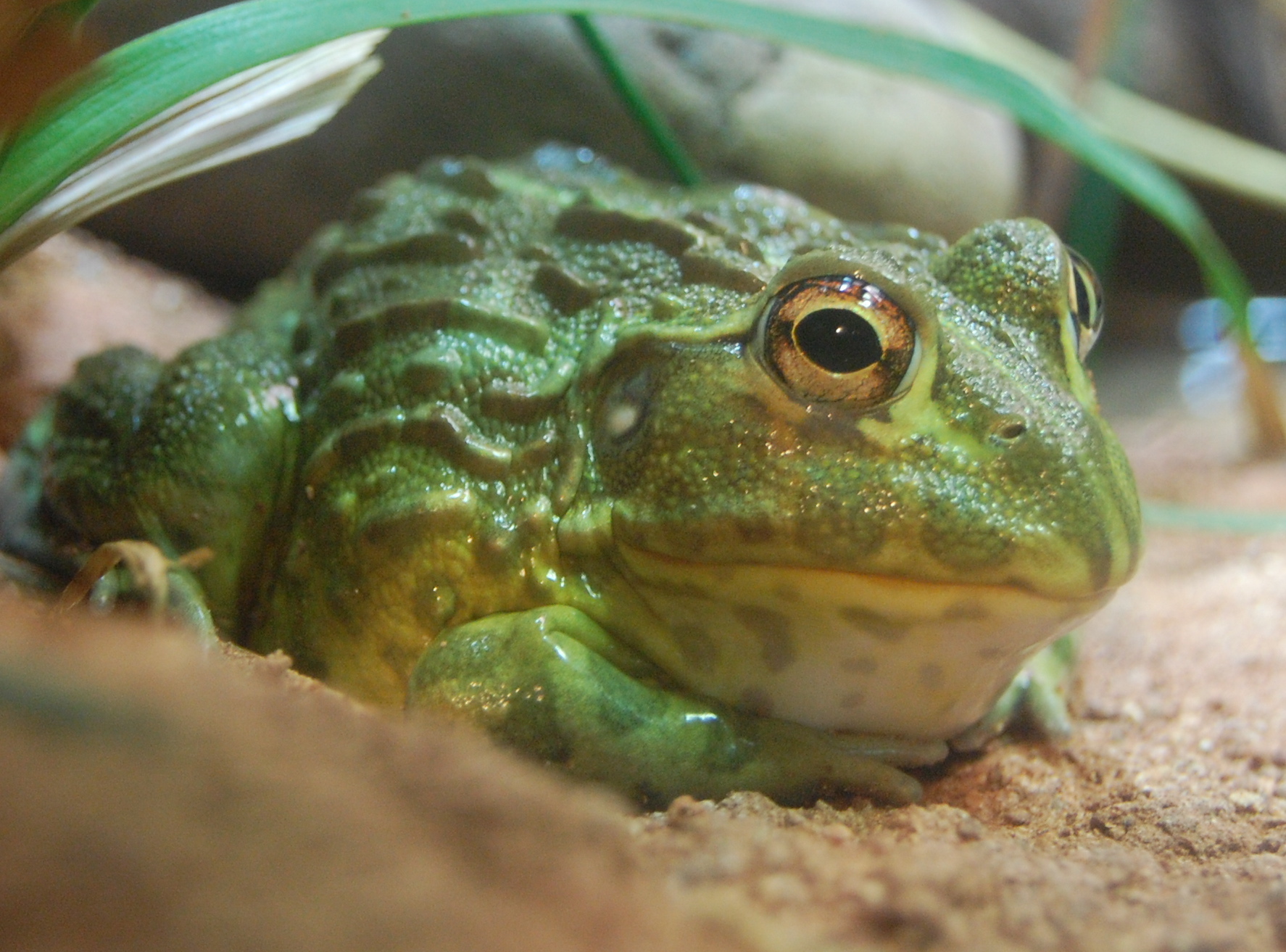
- Pyxicephalus adspersus

Scientific classification
- Kingdom: Animalia
- Phylum: Chordata
- Class: Amphibia
- Order: Anura
- Superfamily: Ranoidea
- Family: Pyxicephalidae; Bonaparte, 1850

Subfamilies
- Cacosterninae (10 genera); Pyxicephalinae (2 genera)

= Pyxicephalidae =

Pyxicephalidae Temporal range: Eocene–Recent

Family of amphibians

The Pyxicephalidae are a family of frogs currently found in sub-Saharan Africa. However, in the Eocene, the taxon Thaumastosaurus lived in Europe.

== Classification ==
The Pyxicephalidae contain two subfamilies, with a total of 12 genera. This family was formerly considered part of the family Ranidae.

Family Pyxicephalidae

- Subfamily Cacosterninae
  - Genus Amietia (16 species)
  - Genus Anhydrophryne (3 species)
  - Genus Arthroleptella (10 species) – moss frogs
  - Genus Cacosternum (16 species)
  - Genus Microbatrachella (monotypic) – micro frog
  - Genus Natalobatrachus (monotypic)
  - Genus Nothophryne (5 species) – mongrel frogs
  - Genus Poyntonia (monotypic)
  - Genus Strongylopus (10 species)
  - Genus Tomopterna (16 species)
- Subfamily Pyxicephalinae
  - Genus Aubria (2 species) – Masako fishing frog, brown ball frog
  - Genus Pyxicephalus (4 species) – African bull frogs, pixie frog
  - Genus †Thaumastosaurus (3-5 species) – western Europe, Eocene (extinct)
