= Fauna of South Africa =

Native animals of South Africa

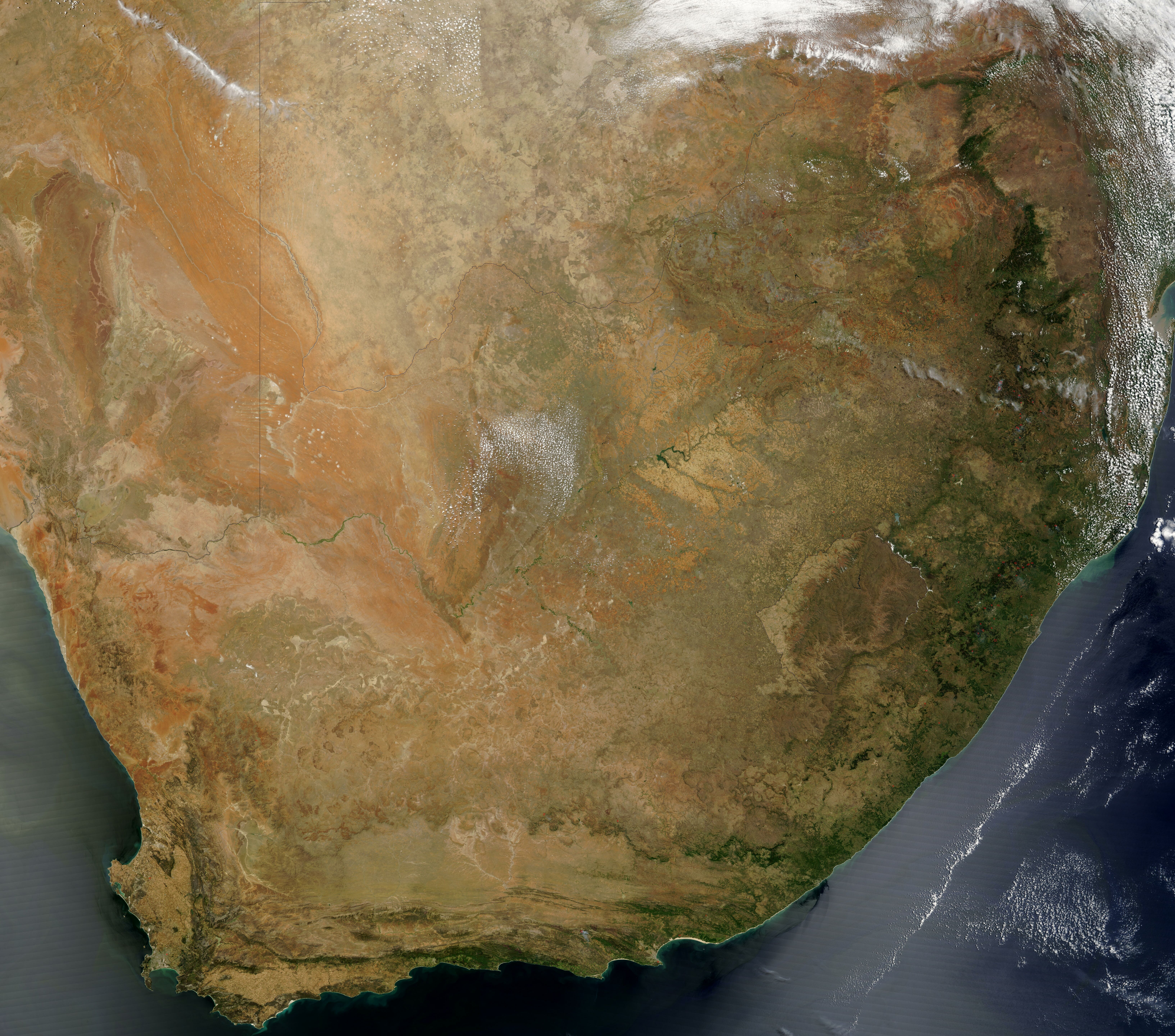
A satellite image of South Africa

The fauna of South Africa is diverse and largely typical of the ecosystems in Africa. South Africa is ranked sixth out of the world's 17 megadiverse countries. Many endemic species are unique to South Africa. The country is among the world leaders in conservation, but at the time wildlife is threatened by poaching and canned hunting.

== Habitats ==
The topography and geology of South Africa is extremely varied, resulting in a wide variety of habitats. Due to this, South Africa enjoys high biodiversity, and is ranked sixth out of the world's seventeen megadiverse countries. In the extreme northwest of the country is true desert, which is the southernmost end of the Namib desert, a desert that is at least 55 million years old, making it the oldest desert in the world. This arid corner intergrades into the extensive semi-arid Karoo found across much of South Africa, covering the Northern Cape and into parts of the Western Cape, Eastern Cape and the Free State. This biome used to be extensive grassland in the past, but has become dominated by small shrubs and succulents due to centuries of overgrazing. To the north and east of these biomes is the Kalahari, which is mainly semi-arid woodland, dominated by thorn trees of the genus Acacia. The north-east and eastern parts of South Africa (Mpumalanga, Limpopo and Kwa-Zulu Natal)is covered with savanna and open woodlands known as bushveld. This area supports the widest variety of wildlife in the country. The most prevalent biome in South Africa is grassland, particularly on the Highveld, where the plant cover is dominated by different grasses and low shrubs. In this biome trees are rare and occur only along watercourses where fires are uncommon. Towards the southern coast, the vegetation is again dominated by shrubs in ecological communities known as thicket and noorsveld, where succulent species such as Euphorbia, Aloe, and Portulacaria afra are common, as well as Cape honeysuckle Tecoma capensis and Cape leadwort Plumbago auriculata. To the west, the vegetation intergrades into Mediterranean shrubland known locally as fynbos, dominated mainly by plant families rare in other habitats, such as Proteaceae, Ericaceae and Restionaceae. Here the vegetation is made up of sclerophyllous plants which do not support much mammal or bird life. Finally, the last biome found is forest, which only covers 1% of South Africa and is concentrated around the Knysna area and scattered along the escarpment of the Drakensberg mountains upwards along Kwa-Zulu Natal.

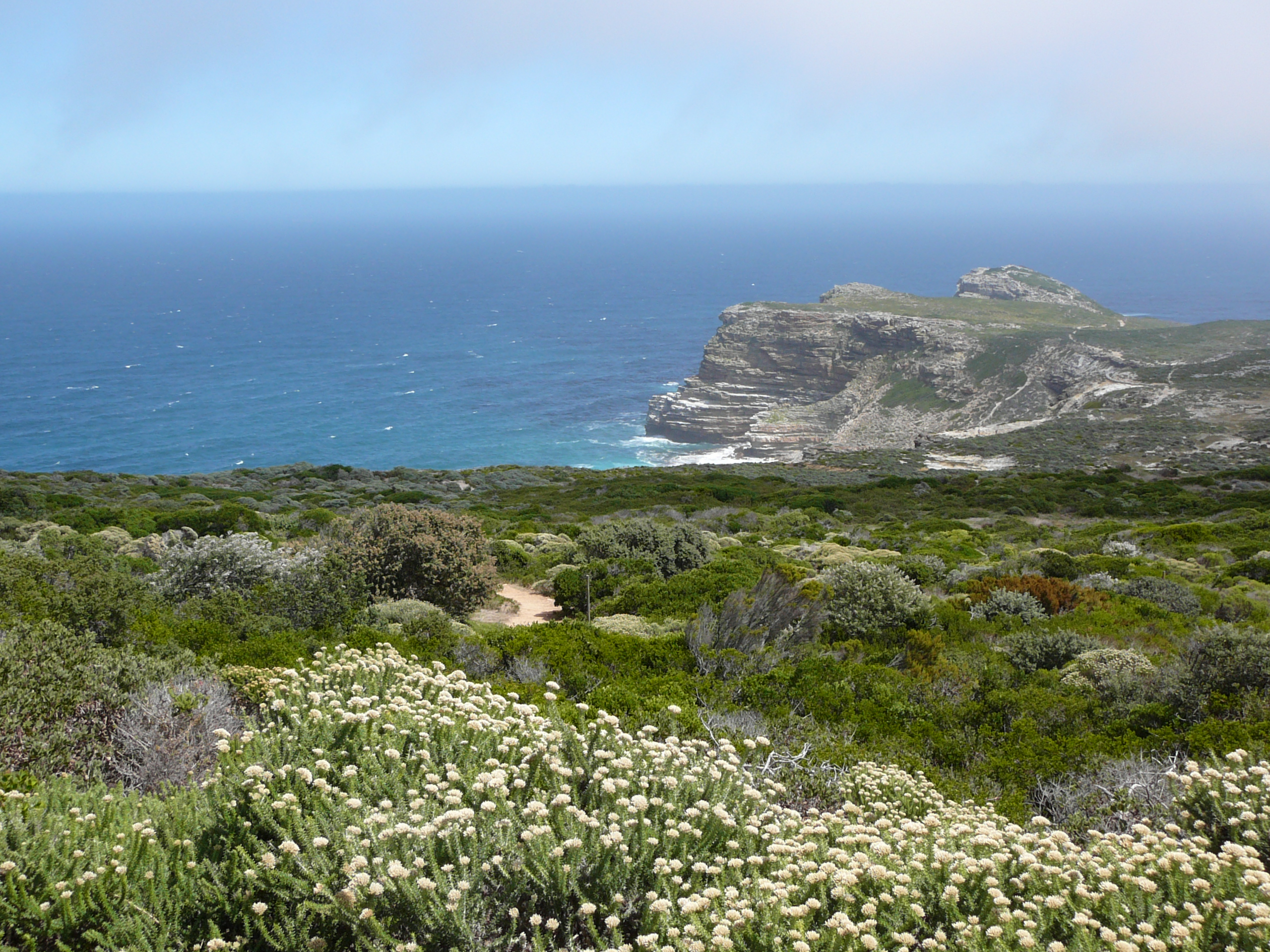
An example of fynbos, seen at Cape Point.

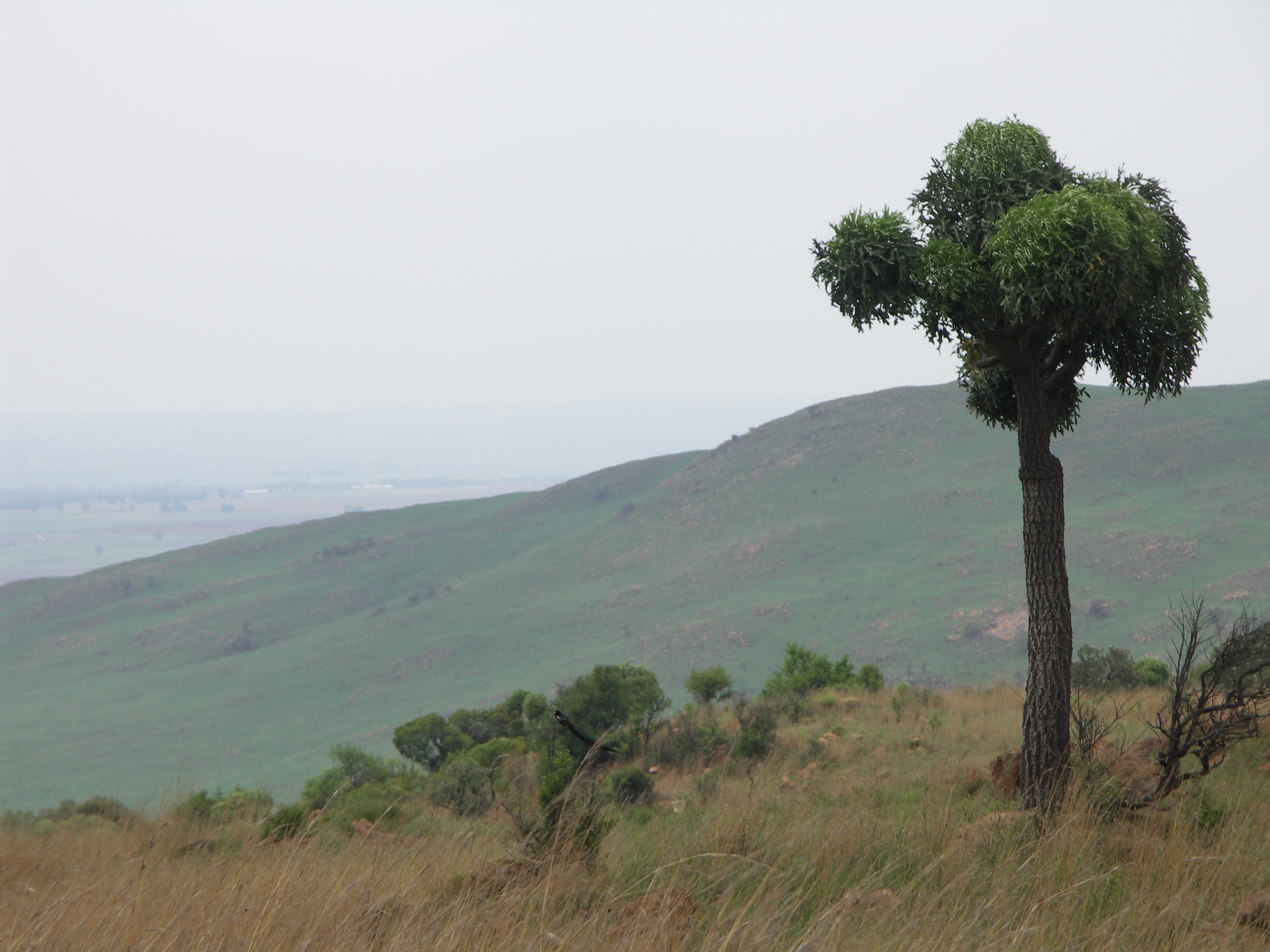
Highveld habitat with a Highveld cabbage tree Cussonia paniculata

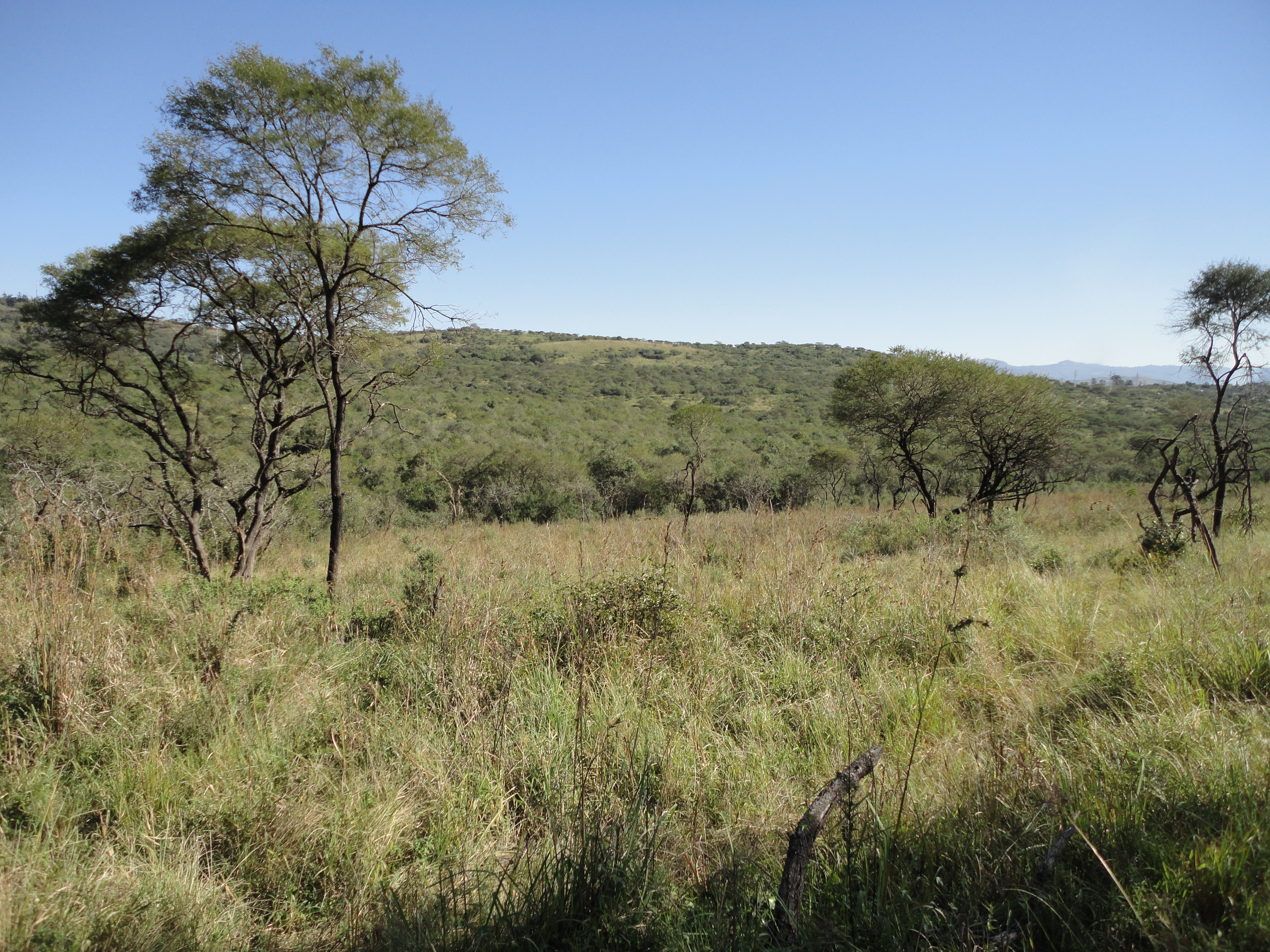
A typical bushveld ecological community

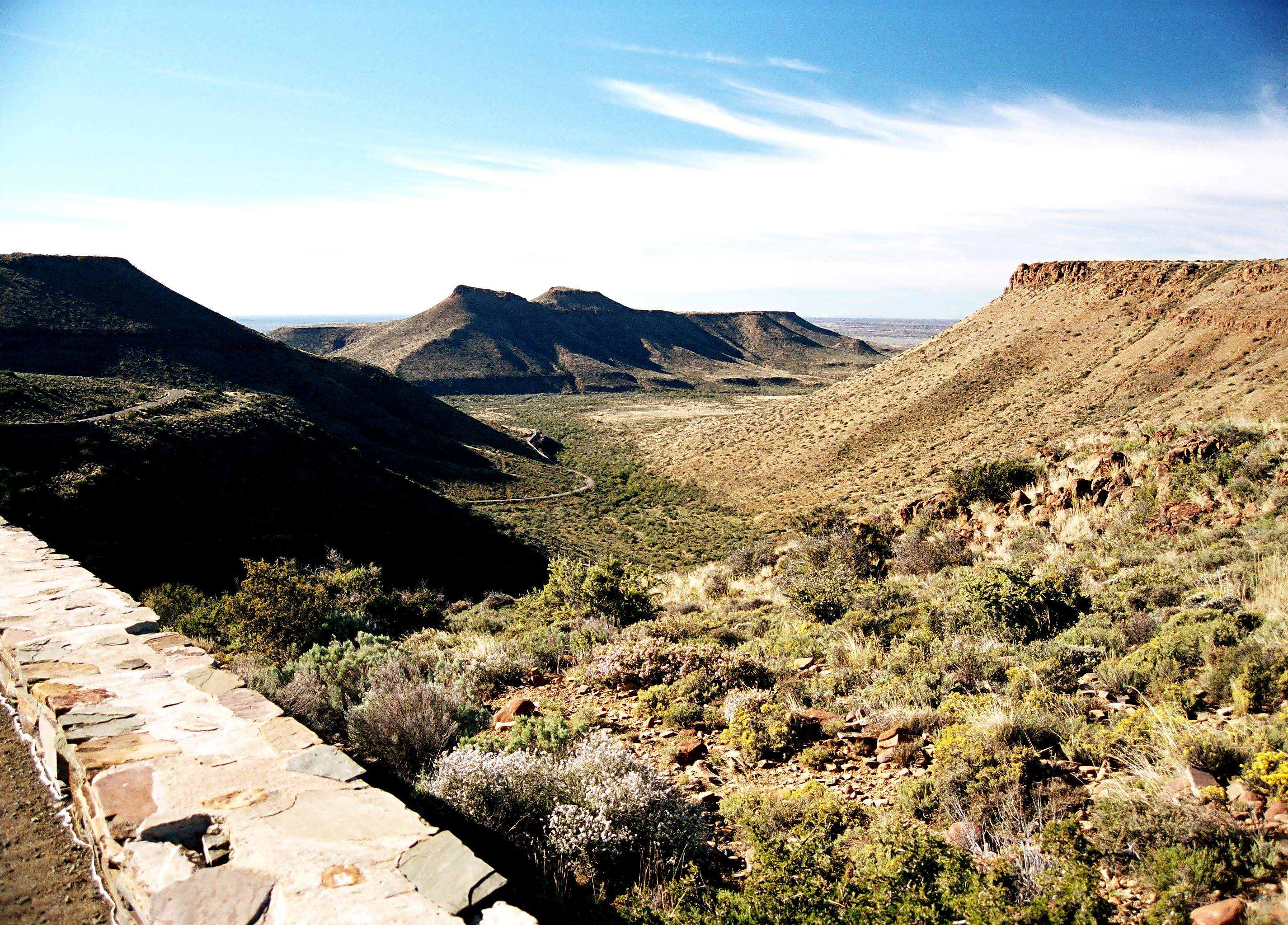
Semi-desert vegetation in Karoo National Park in the Karoo

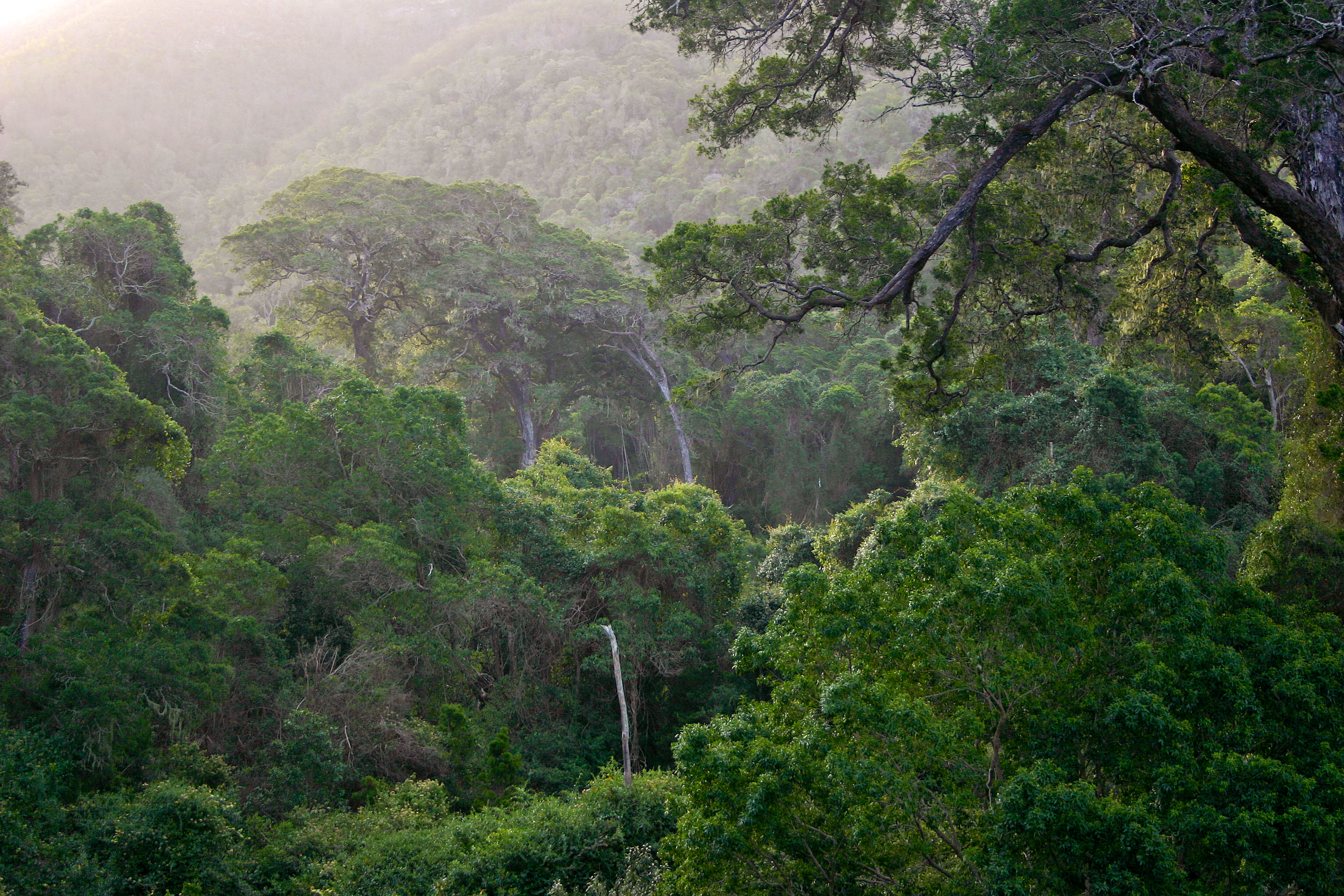
The forest in the Knysna region, typified by Podocarpus species

== Mammals ==
The country has over 300 species of mammals.

=== Carnivores ===
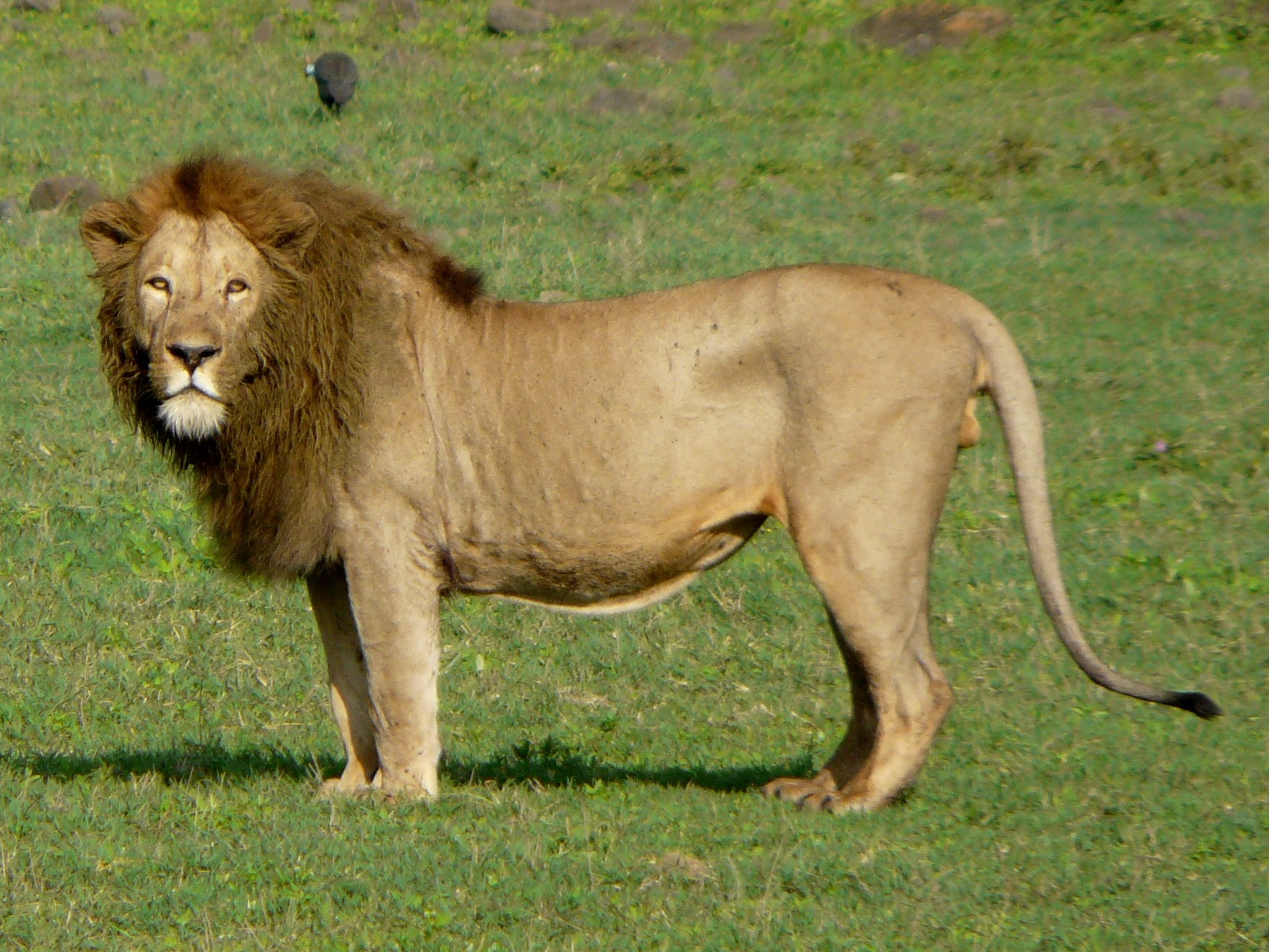
A male lion.

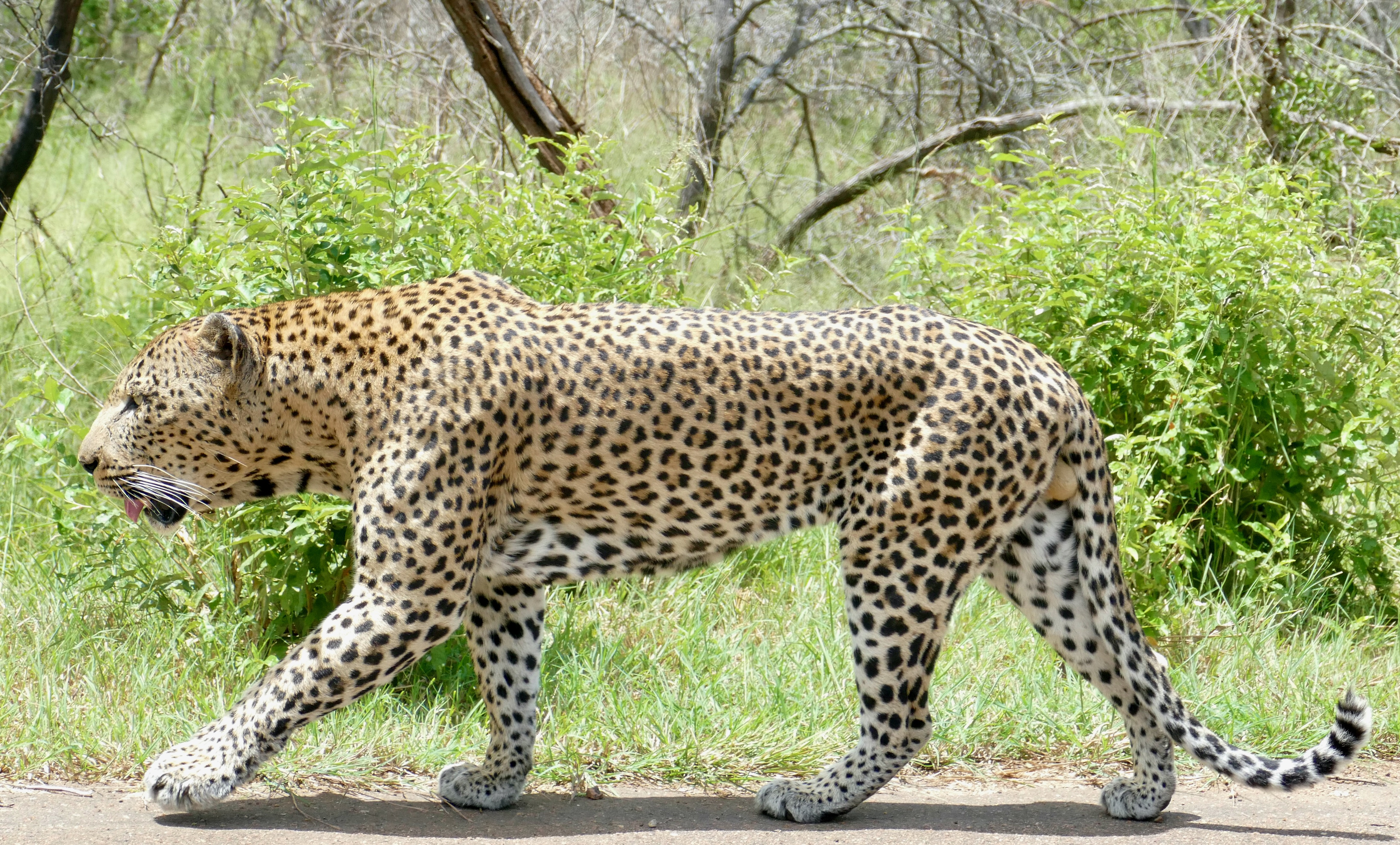
An African leopard.

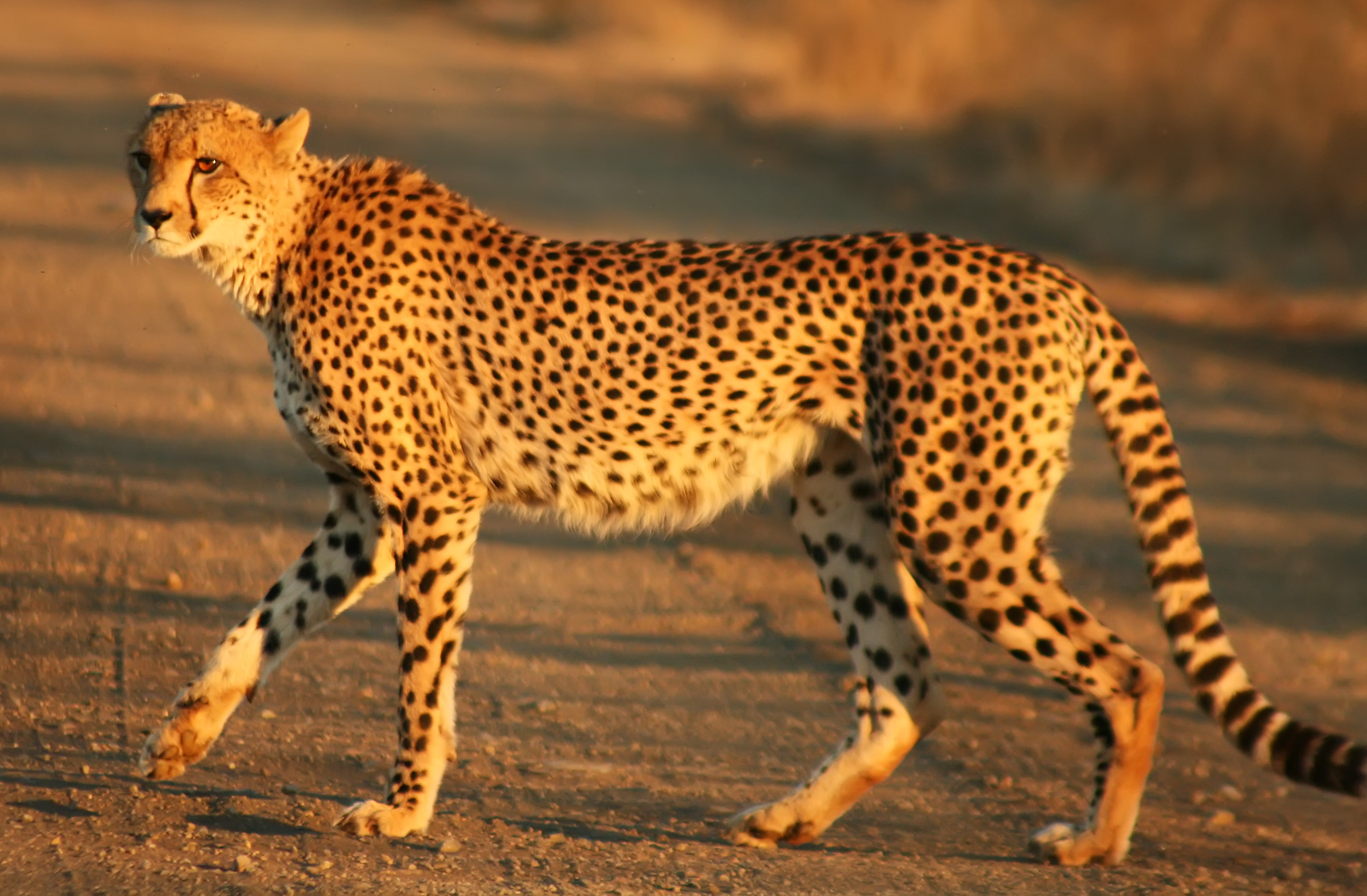
A South African cheetah in the Kruger National Park.

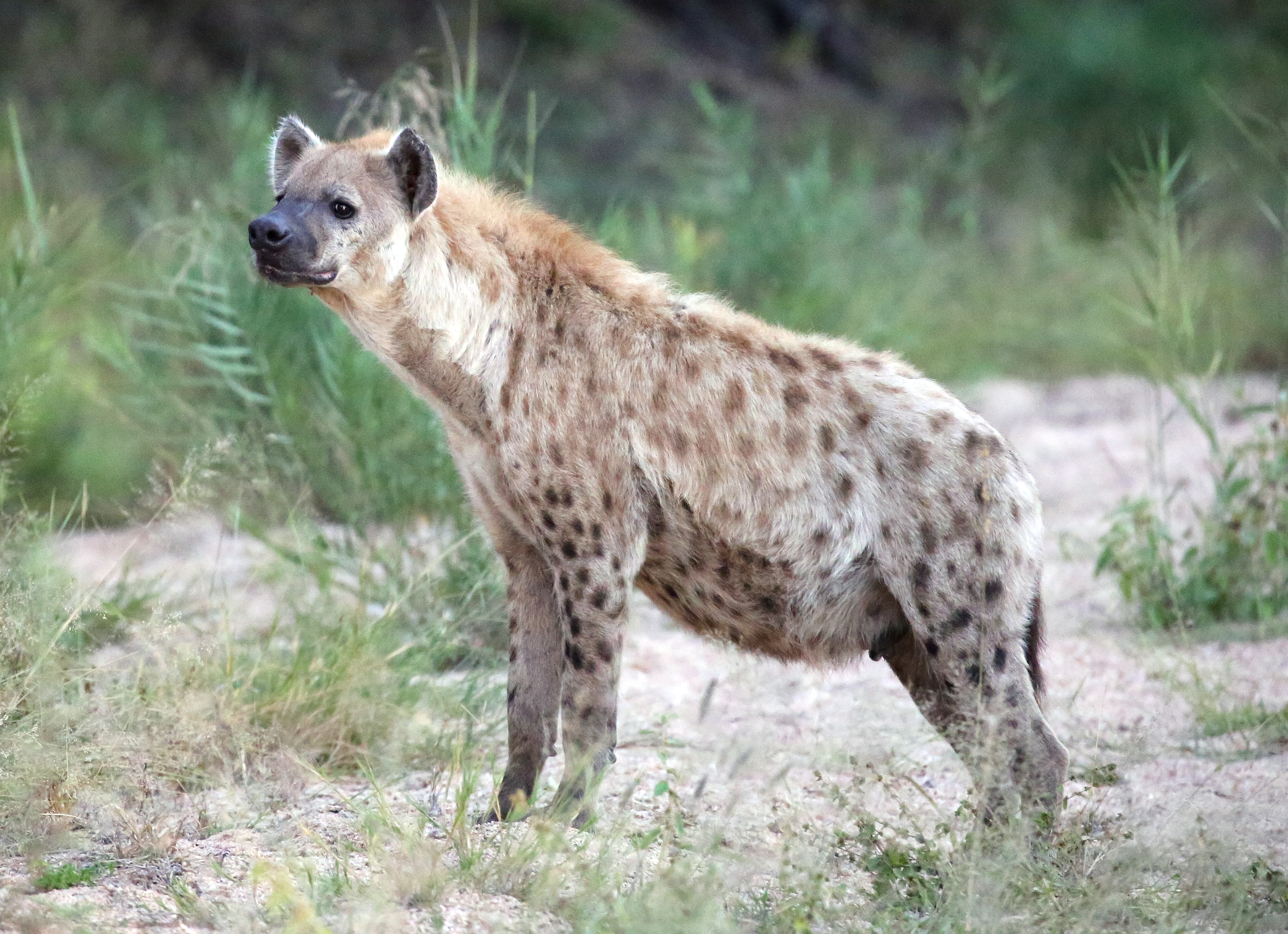
Spotted hyenas are common in many reserves.

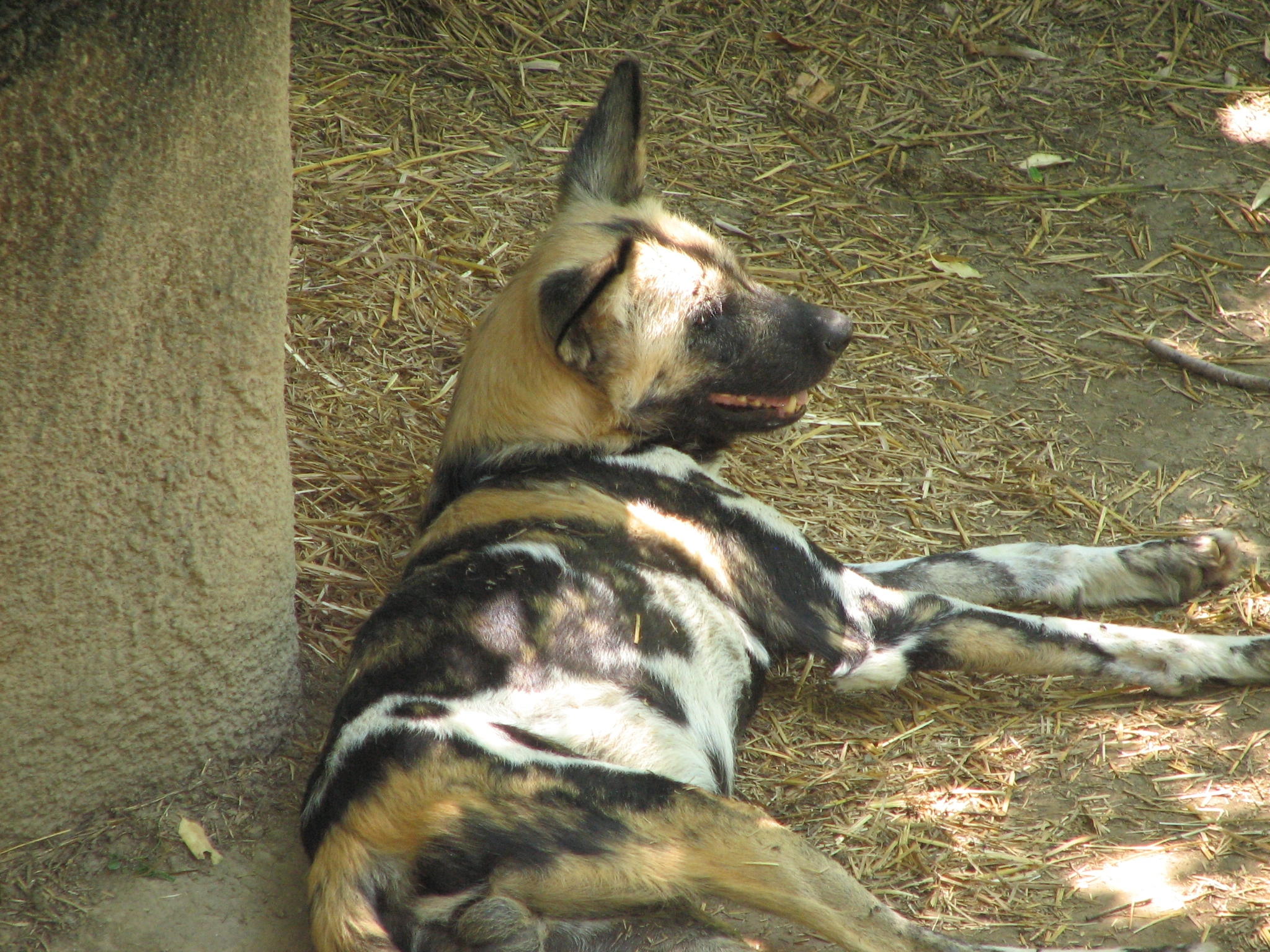
The endangered African wild dog.

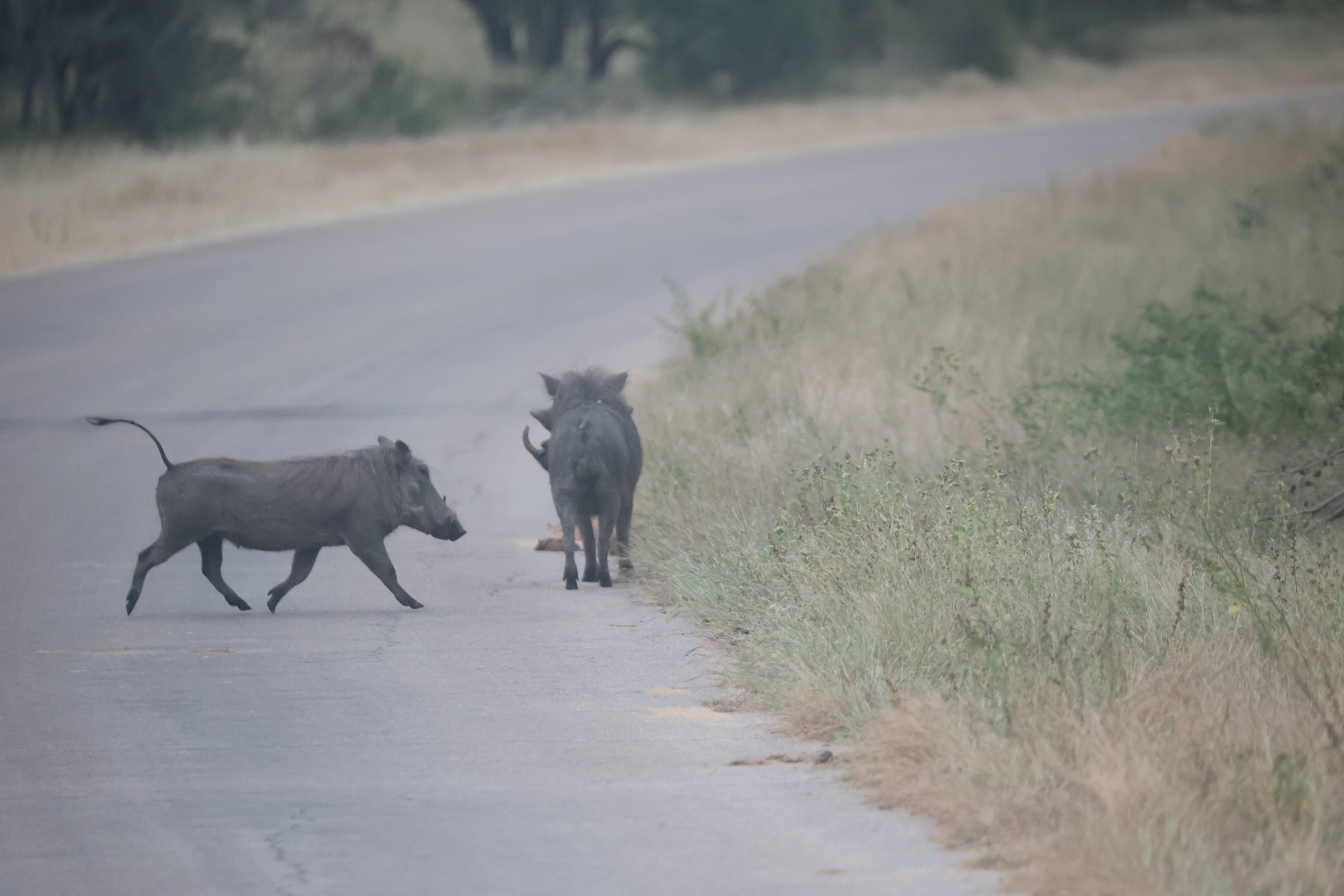
Common warthogs in savanna habitat, representative fauna of South Africa

Many carnivores, both large and small, inhabit South Africa. Most carnivoran families are well represented in South Africa, such as Canidae, Felidae, Hyaenidae, Mustelidae, Viverridae, Herpestidae, and Otariidae. Most famous of these is the lion, the largest carnivore on the continent and the second-largest cat in the world. The other two big cats are the African leopard and the South African cheetah. The spotted hyena is commonly found in most large game reserves, while the brown hyena inhabits the arid parts of the country, and the aardwolf is widespread. The African wild dog is an endangered species and is found mainly in the Kruger National Park and surrounding areas.

Smaller carnivores are common across the country, and two species, the black-backed jackal and the caracal, are seen by some as pest species, often taking livestock such as sheep and goats, as lion, leopard, cheetah, African wild dog, and both species of hyena have been largely extirpated outside of protected areas. The serval is a rodent specialist and often occurs in marshy areas. Bat-eared foxes, Cape foxes and small felids such as the black-footed cat (Felis nigripes) and Southern African wildcat (Felis sylvestris cafra) are widespread, although there are concerns about the genetic purity of the African wild cat, as it breeds readily with both domestic and feral domestic cats (Felis sylvestris catus), which dilutes the African wild cat's gene pool. There are many species of mongoose, such as the meerkat, yellow mongoose and water mongoose. There are two genet species, the common genet and the large spotted genet. There are relatively few mustelid species in South Africa, as it appears that most niches taken by mustelids elsewhere in the world are taken up by viverrids and herpestids in sub-Saharan Africa (only seven species are native to Africa south of the Sahara). Two species of otter are native to South Africa, both inhabiting freshwater habitats and the Cape clawless otter ranging into the sea at the coast. The honey badger is probably the best known mustelid native to the region; aside from the otters, two other species occur, the African striped weasel and the striped polecat - their black-and-white fur serves the same function as that of skunks. The only seal native to the region is the brown fur seal, which breeds in large colonies off Namibia and South Africa.

=== Herbivores ===
Artiodactyls

South Africa has many antelope species, some which are widespread and are well known in other parts of the world, and some that are endemic. There is an extinct species of antelope endemic to South Africa known as the bluebuck. Several antelopes are found in different habitats. Species such as the gemsbok are found in arid areas, the black wildebeest (an endemic species) in grasslands, the Cape grysbok in fynbos, the impala in savanna and the klipspringer in rocky terrain. Other species range in a wider variety of habitats, such as the Springbok in arid shrublands, semidesert and grassland, and the Greater Kudu in thicket, open woodlands and riverine vegetation. South Africa has a wealth of small antelope species, such as the aforementioned klipspringer and Cape grysbok, common duiker, blue duiker, steenbok and oribi.

There are also larger artiodactyl species, such as the Cape buffalo, common eland and the giraffe. These are preyed upon mainly by lions.

Common warthogs are common in the east of the country. Bushpigs occur in habitats with dense cover.

Distantly related to the warthog and the bushpig but closer to cetaceans is the hippopotamus, an amphibious mammal that usually submerges itself in water bodies during the day and comes on land to feed on grasses during the night. The hippopotamus is found in the eastern part of the country down to the St Lucia wetlands/ Kosi Bay estuary in Kwa-Zulu Natal, although they used to be much more widespread, occurring as far west as Cape Town and down the length of the Orange River. There is a small population of hippos in Cape Town, where they were reintroduced to control alien vegetation. After their arrival in 1652 the Dutch settlers, led by founder of Cape Town Jan van Riebeeck, shot the resident hippopotamus population to extinction for meat and hides.

Perissiodactyls

Herbivores which are not artiodactyls also occur in the region. There are two native species of equids in the country, the plains zebra and the mountain zebra. An extinct subspecies of the plains zebra, the quagga, was endemic to the country.

Both the white rhinoceros and the black rhinoceros occur in the country. Neither can be distinguished by the colour, as both are a similar colour, but can be told apart by the shape of their mouths: with the white rhino, it has a wide or square mouth, while the black has a hook-lipped mouth. Both also behave differently, with the black rhino being smaller, shyer, and more aggressive.

=== Rodents, insectivores and lagomorphs ===
There are again many species of rodents in South Africa, such as the vlei rat and four-striped grass mouse.

The three alien species of muroid rodents, the brown rat, the black rat and the house mouse, are all widespread in the country.

The Cape ground squirrel is common in arid areas and often shares its burrows with mongooses and meerkats, and is known to use its bushy tail as an umbrella from the harsh sun. There are tree squirrels, one of which is an introduced species: the eastern grey squirrel, introduced in Cape Town by Cecil John Rhodes from Europe. The rest, such as Paraxerus cepapi, are found in the savanna biome in the north-east of the country.

Shrews occur, which prey on invertebrates. The Southern African hedgehog (Atelerix frontalis) is a hedgehog that is native to South Africa. It differs from the European hedgehog in having a dark face bordered by white fur and longer legs, an adaptation to a warmer climate. They are found in the Eastern Cape northwards to Zimbabwe.

The South African springhare is common in savanna and semiarid habitats. This animal is similar in appearance to a small wallaby, but it is actually a rodent. It consumes tubers and bulbs.

Scrub hares and Cape hares are common in all regions of South Africa, and are a common prey item of many predatory species such as leopards, cheetahs and birds of prey. The riverine rabbit is a critically endangered species of rabbit that is confined to several small populations in the Karoo. Smith's red rock hare (Pronolagus rupestris), Jameson's red rock hare (Pronolagus randensis) and the Natal red rock hare (P. crassicaudatus) are three species of hare that live in rocky environments, hence their name. These species are isolated from one another in where they live. There is an introduced population of European rabbits on Robben Island, which is under a culling programme.

=== Afrotheria ===
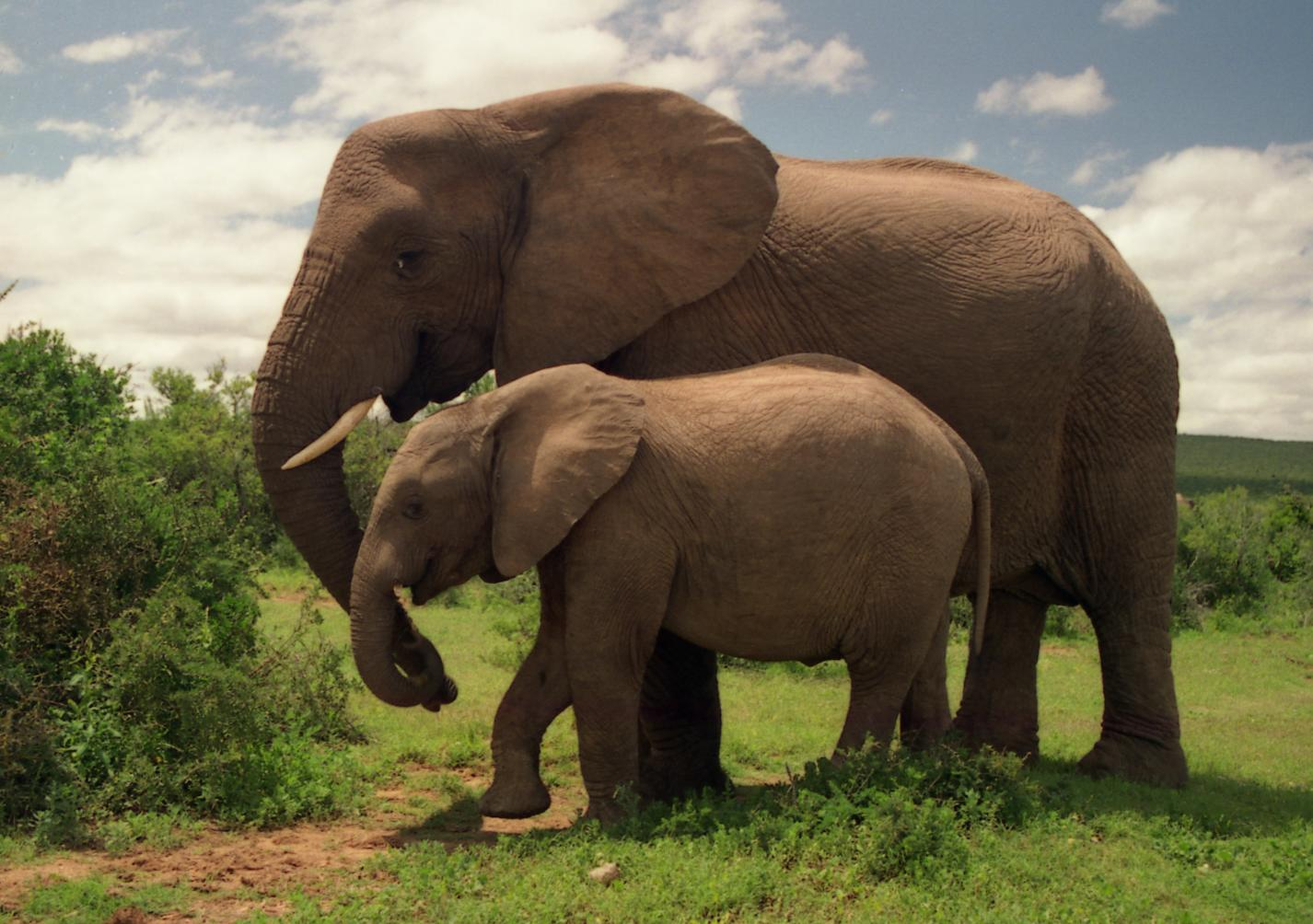
A pair of elephants in Addo Elephant National Park in the Eastern Cape.

The origins of the taxon Afrotheria is deeply rooted in the African continent. The best known of these is the aardvark and the African bush elephant. Most members of the Afrotheria have remained in Africa.

The African bush elephant is the only proboscidean in South Africa, and the largest native animal. It is an ecosystem engineer, opening up dense thicket and woodland for more open-habitat species.

The aardvark is an odd-looking creature. It is a prodigious digger and sleeps in burrows during the day. It feeds mainly on termites and ants.

There are two species of dassies or hyraxes, the rock hyrax and the tree hyrax, the former widespread over the country and the latter occurring in the eastern part of the country. They are relatives of the elephants, although not the closest (sirenians are more closely related). Their major predators are the Verreaux's eagle and the caracal.

Elephant shrews resemble shrews but are not related to them. They similarly eat arthropods.

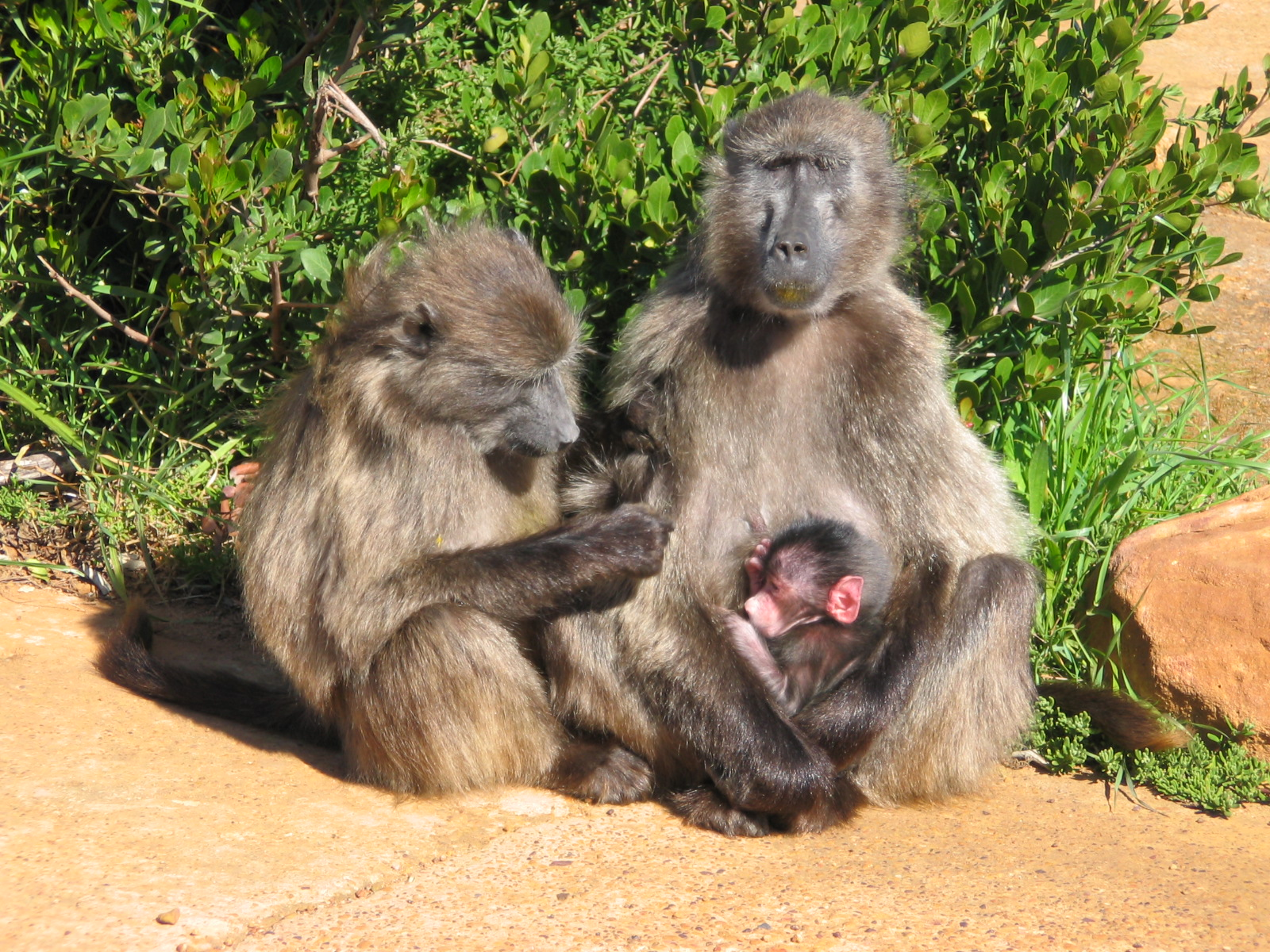
A family of chacma baboons resting during daily foraging activity.

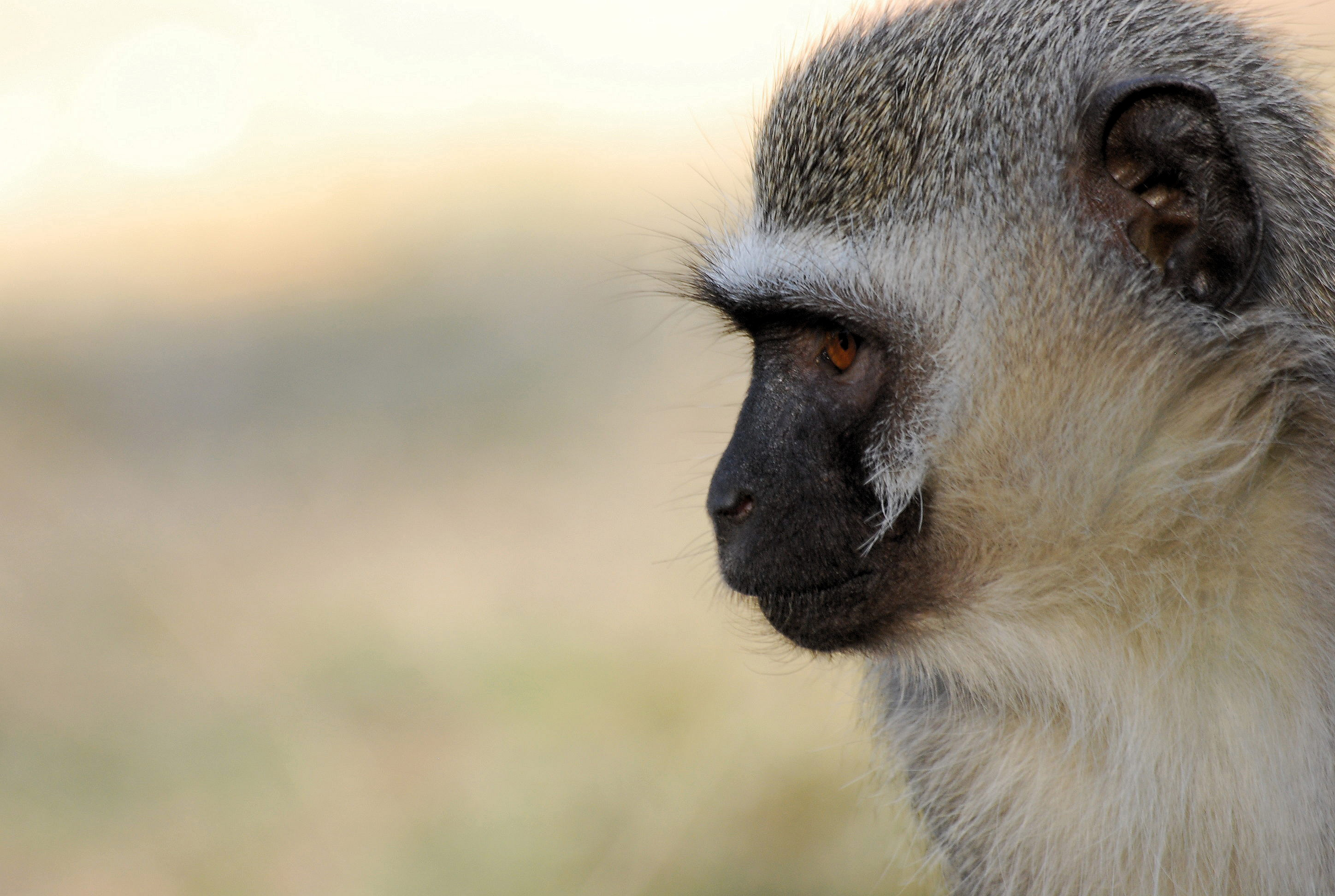
Profile of a vervet monkey.

=== Primates ===
The largest primate in the region, excluding humans, is the chacma baboon. A true generalist, it is found in virtually all habitats in South Africa. The other primates in the region are the vervet monkey and the Samango monkey. They are mainly frugivores, although they are true opportunists and may take eggs and nestlings from bird nests.

== Avifauna ==
858 species of birds have been recorded in South Africa.

=== Raptors ===
There are many raptor species found in South Africa, some of which are the eagles, hawks, falcons and vultures.

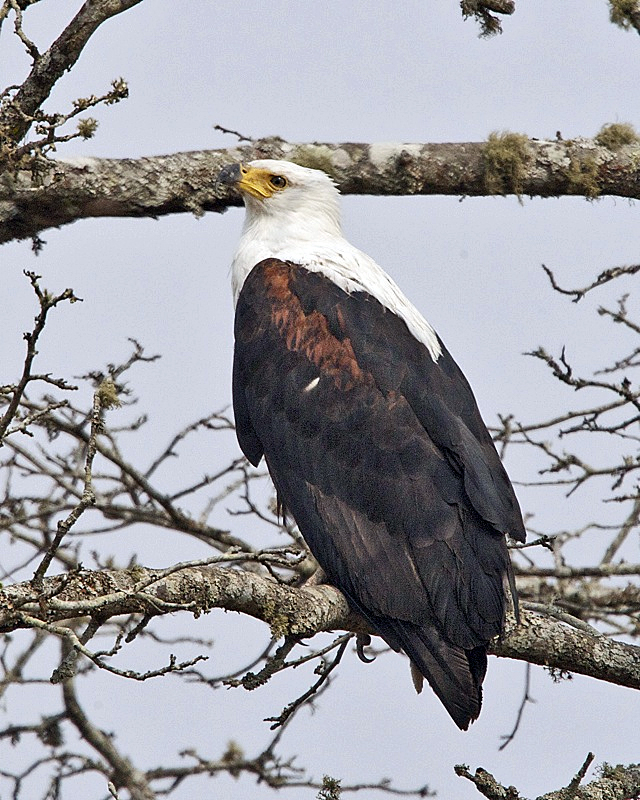
An African fish eagle perching in a tree.

Eagles are widespread over the country. Different species inhabit different habitats. The African fish eagle is found wherever there are large bodies of water, and takes mainly fish and occasionally other vertebrates. The martial eagle is found in savanna, while Verreaux's eagle is found in areas with rocky terrain and mountains. The Verreaux's eagle is being given attention by conservation authorities as there has been noticeable population decline in some areas. It is an important predator of the rock hyrax. The crowned eagle is a forest species, and takes monkeys and duikers. There are myriad species of hawk found across the country; examples are harriers, sparrowhawks, the African harrier hawk, Buteo species known as buzzards (the jackal buzzard), and kites, such the black-winged kite.

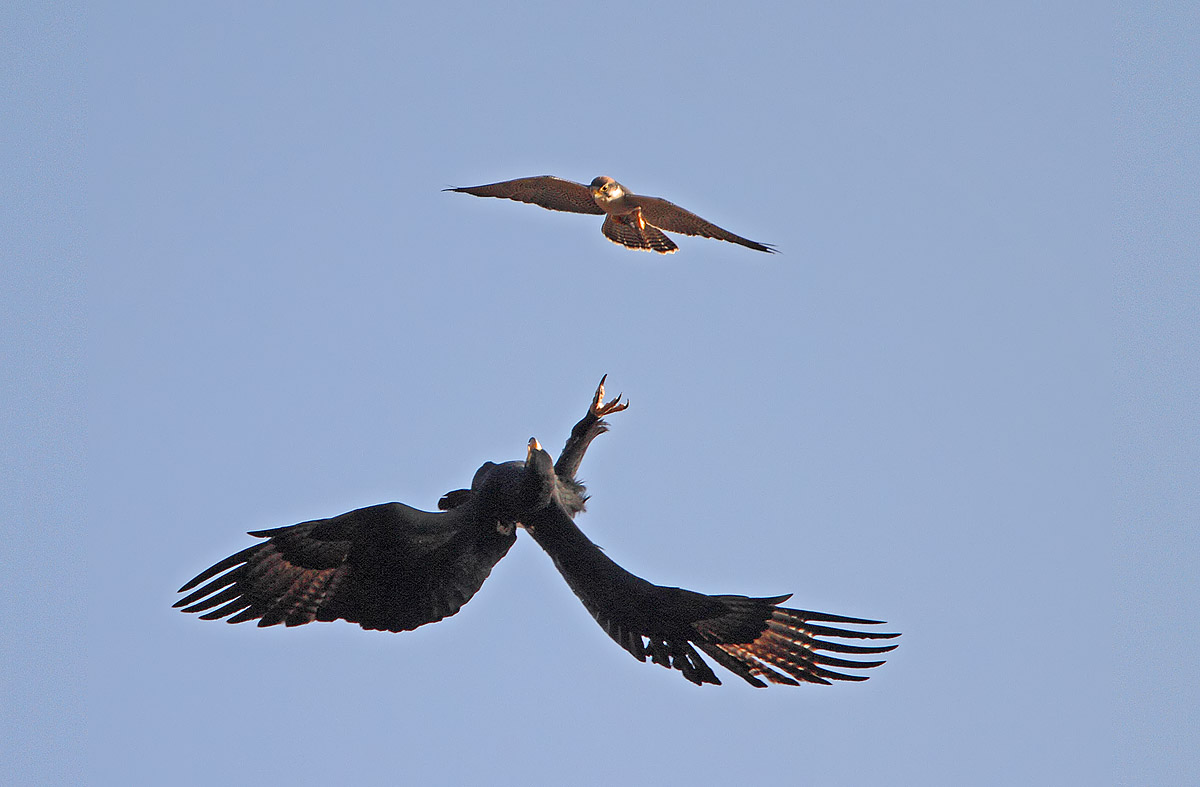
A lanner falcon mobbing a Verreaux's eagle

The falcons are well represented by a number of species. The peregrine falcon is both a resident and a visitor, and nests mainly on cliffs. More common than the peregrine and similar in appearance is the lanner falcon. Both prey mainly on other birds. The rock kestrel is widespread. There is a highly localised population of the Taita falcon.

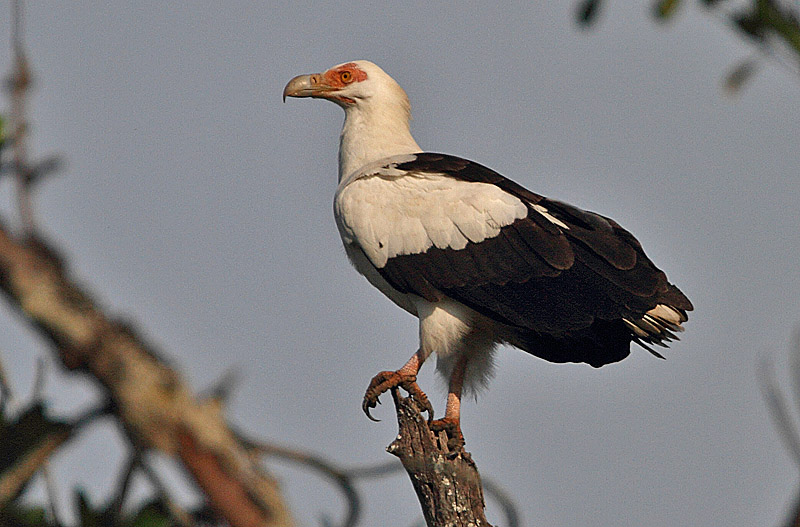
A palm-nut vulture roosting in a tree.

The vultures that occur in South Africa are Old World vultures, locally represented by the lappet-faced vulture, the white-backed vulture, the Cape vulture and the highly unusual palm-nut vulture. The Egyptian vulture is extinct as a local resident and occurs only as a rare vagrant. All the vultures except the palm-nut are scavengers.

=== Game birds and waterfowl ===
Gamebirds

The gamebirds are represented by the families Numididae and the large family Phasianidae.

The guineafowls are characterised in South Africa by the crested guineafowl which is restricted to bushveld, and the helmeted guineafowl, which is widespread and common in urban and agricultural areas.

The Phasianidae are locally constituted of the francolins, quails, partridges and the Indian peafowl, which is an alien species that has escaped from captivity in some areas. Some of the francolins include the Cape francolin, Swainson's francolin, and Natal francolin, to name a few. The quails are represented by the harlequin quail and the common quail. The chukar partridge, another alien species from Eurasia, is restricted to Robben Island.

The waterfowl are well represented in South Africa. They include the dabbling ducks of the genus Anas, the shelducks and the sheldgeese, the extremely common Egyptian goose, and the spur-winged goose.

=== Near-passerines ===
Hornbills, bee-eaters, rollers, kingfishers, the hoopoe and woodhoopoes are all common in the region.

Hornbills The largest species is the southern ground hornbill. It occurs only in nature reserves. Other well-known species include the southern yellow-billed hornbill, the southern red-billed hornbill, the African grey hornbill and the trumpeter hornbill. Hornbills are characterised by a large downcurved bill which is frequently brightly coloured and sometimes has a casque on the upper mandible. They are omnivores, eating both fruit and small animals such as chameleons; the ground hornbill is an adept hunter and will forage in packs, flushing out prey such as locusts, lizards and even tortoises.

Bee-eaters Bee-eaters are brightly coloured birds with a long dark, decurved bill, useful for holding bees and wasps at beak's length. The most common is the southern carmine bee-eater. bee-eaters nest in holes on river banks.

Rollers Similar in colour to the bee-eaters but resembling crows in size and shape are the rollers, family Coraciidae. Among the most well-known is the lilac-breasted roller and the European roller. They hawk for insects from perches.

Kingfishers The kingfishers are famous as hunters of fish, but not all species hunt fish or over water. Indeed, some hunt away from water, such as the brown-hooded kingfisher, which is a woodland species that hunts large insects and small vertebrates. Some South African species are among the largest of their kind, such as the giant kingfisher and the pied kingfisher. Others are the smallest, such as the malachite kingfisher.

Hoopoe and wood-hoopoes The hoopoe is one of the most wide-ranging bird species in the world, resident over much of Europe, Asia and Africa. The African subspecies (which some authorities elevate to full species status), is more russet in colour than its northerly relative and feeds similarly on insects, hawking for them and probing the soil with the long bill.

Wood-hoopoes, despite the name, are not related to the hoopoe, but along with the scimitarbills reside in a family all of their own, the Phoeniculidae. The green woodhoopoe is widespread over much of the country, and the other South African species is the common scimitarbill. The wood-hoopoes feed on arthropods, especially insects, which they find by probing with their bills in rotten wood and in crevices in bark, such as on the paper-bark thorn.

=== Passerines ===
The passerines are one of the largest bird orders, with over 5,000 identified species.

Starlings and oxpeckers

There are several species of starling in South Africa, two of which are introduced species: the common starling and the common myna. The common starling was introduced by Cecil John Rhodes in 1890 from Europe in Cape Town. The common myna was introduced in Durban in 1902 and has become common in Kwa-Zulu Natal and has spread further north to Gauteng. Fortunately, it has no significant impact on rural and natural habitats.

The red-winged starling is extremely common and widespread across the country, absent only in the arid north-west, where it is replaced by its close relative the pale-winged starling. The difference between the two is that the red-winged has rufous primaries while the pale-winged has whitish primaries edged with orange. The pale-winged has a bright red or orange eye, while the red-winged's is dark, almost black. Only the female of the red-winged has a grey head.

The pied starling occurs over much of the country.

Corvids

There are four species of corvid which occur in the region, three native and one introduced (the house crow, likely ship-assisted). The pied crow is widespread and common including in urban areas, with the white-necked raven, the largest corvid in the region, inhabiting mountainous areas and increasingly in urban areas. The Cape crow is mainly restricted to rural habitats. The house crow can be found in Cape Town and Durban, where control measures have been implemented with varying degrees of success.

=== Ratites ===
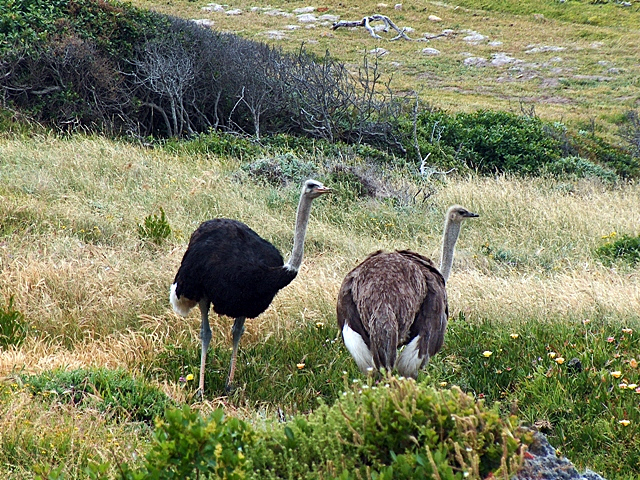
An ostrich pair at Cape Point.

The only ratite in the country and the largest bird in the world is the common ostrich. It is widely farmed in the Little Karoo region.

== Amphibians ==
Amphibians in South Africa are represented by the frogs and toads (order Anura); the salamander and caecilian orders are absent. About 110 out of the 135 species of frog native to Southern Africa exist in South Africa, about 50% of them endemic. About 15% of the total number of species are threatened to varying degrees according to IUCN guidelines. Frogs tend to be less abundant in the arid west compared to the rest of the country.

The ten or so families in South Africa are as follows:

Rain frogs

The rain frogs belong to the family Microhylidae and are classified in the genus Breviceps. Rain frogs are unable to swim; if they fall into a body of water, they puff up and float until they reach the shore.

River or 'typical' frogs

The Cape river frog falls under the family Pyxicephalidae, and is widespread over the country, also occurring in Namibia, Lesotho, and Swaziland. In the same family is the critically endangered micro frog, classified in its own genus, Microbatrachella. Genus Pyxicephalus comprises the African bullfrog, which are among the biggest amphibians in the world.

Cacos, puddle frogs, African torrent frogs

The common caco is a species of frog in the family Petropedetidae. This family, along with the Pyxicephalidae mentioned above, are often placed as subfamilies in the family Ranidae.

Ghost frogs

The family Heleophrynidae is endemic to Southern Africa and are known as the ghost frogs. They inhabit fast-moving streams. Some are confined to restricted areas in South Africa, such as the Table Mountain ghost frog and the natal ghost frog.

'Typical' toads

The 'typical' toads, of family Bufonidae, include the western leopard toad, the raucous toad, the guttural toad and a few other species.

Clawed frogs

The Pipidae are a family of primitive, aquatic frogs, with representatives both in Southern Africa and South America. The most famous member is the African clawed frog, or Platanna. This frog is a model organism for biological study, and it was once used extensively for pregnancy tests, where the urine from pregnant women induced the frog to lay eggs. The platanna may be the source of the chytrid fungus that is devastating frog species worldwide. A less well-known relative is the Cape platanna, which is endangered.

Sedge and bush frogs

The family Hyperoliidae has a few representatives in South Africa, including the painted reed frog, the arum lily reed frog, and Kassina maculata.

Moss frogs

The only locally occurring member of the family Rhacophoridae, the grey foam-nest treefrog has an interesting breeding system. A female lays her eggs onto a tree branch. Several males then cluster around her and fertilise the eggs by producing sperm which they whip into a foamy 'nest' with their hind legs. After a period of time, the tadpoles exit this 'foam nest' and drop into the pond or puddle below. This species is present in the north-east of the country.

Squeakers

The common squeaker is another species which is the sole representative of its family, in this case Arthroleptidae, in South Africa.

Shovelnose frogs

The Marbled snout-burrower is a member of the family Hemisotidae.

== Reptiles ==
Many reptiles inhabit South Africa, including snakes, lizards, tortoises and turtles, and crocodiles.

The Nile crocodile inhabits water bodies located in the north and east of the country; the west and south are either too cool or too arid for the crocodile. Warning signs are placed wherever crocodiles are known to exist to alert people to their presence; the Nile crocodile is one of the most dangerous animals in Africa.

Many species of snake, both venomous and non-venomous, make South Africa their home. The largest is the African rock python, a non-venomous snake that kills its prey, which includes creatures up to the size of an antelope, by constriction. A much smaller species that also kills by constriction is the mole snake; as its name suggests, this snake preys on small mammals, most often rodents such as mole-rats. Many venomous snakes occur, some of which include famous examples such as the black mamba (one of the most deadly snakes in the world), eastern green mamba, boomslang, Cape cobra and rinkhals. Though human fatalities can occur, these snakes are normally timid and prefer to avoid humans. Snakes, both venomous and non-venomous, are important in controlling rodent populations.

Several species of tortoise occur. The most widespread is the leopard tortoise, which inhabits semi-arid and grassland habitats.

== Fish, sea, and river life ==
South Africa has rich and varied sea life, thanks to the confluence of two major oceans (the Atlantic and the Indian) around its southernmost point, Cape Agulhas.

The country is well known for its great white sharks; shark tourism is an important part of tourism in the southern Cape region.

Coelacanths, formerly considered extinct since the Late Cretaceous period, were discovered in 1938 when one was caught off the eastern coast of the country. A population exists in iSimangaliso Wetland Park, Kwazulu-Natal.

== Terrestrial invertebrates ==
=== Oligochaeta ===
The Oligochaeta fauna is represented by over 140 species of the families Acanthodrilidae, Enchytraeidae, Eudrilidae, Haplotaxidae, Microchaetidae and Tritogeniidae.

=== Insecta ===
Coleoptera
Beetles are among best studied South African insect groups and include a number of endemic species.

Lepidoptera

Diptera
The flies native to South Africa have been classified into over 90 families.

Hymenoptera

== Threats to wildlife ==
Poaching of rhinoceroses has become a national issue for South Africa. In 2015, 1175 rhinos were killed for their horn, which is an ingredient in traditional Chinese medicine. Since then, the rate of rhinos being poached for their horn has been increasing exponentially every year. However, this trend was bucked in 2015, where the number of rhinos poached were lower than the year before. Currently, poaching is carried out by sophisticated criminal syndicates.

Bones and body parts of at least 6,058 lions were exported from South Africa between 2008 and 2016. Owners of private game ranches breed lions for the canned hunting industry.
