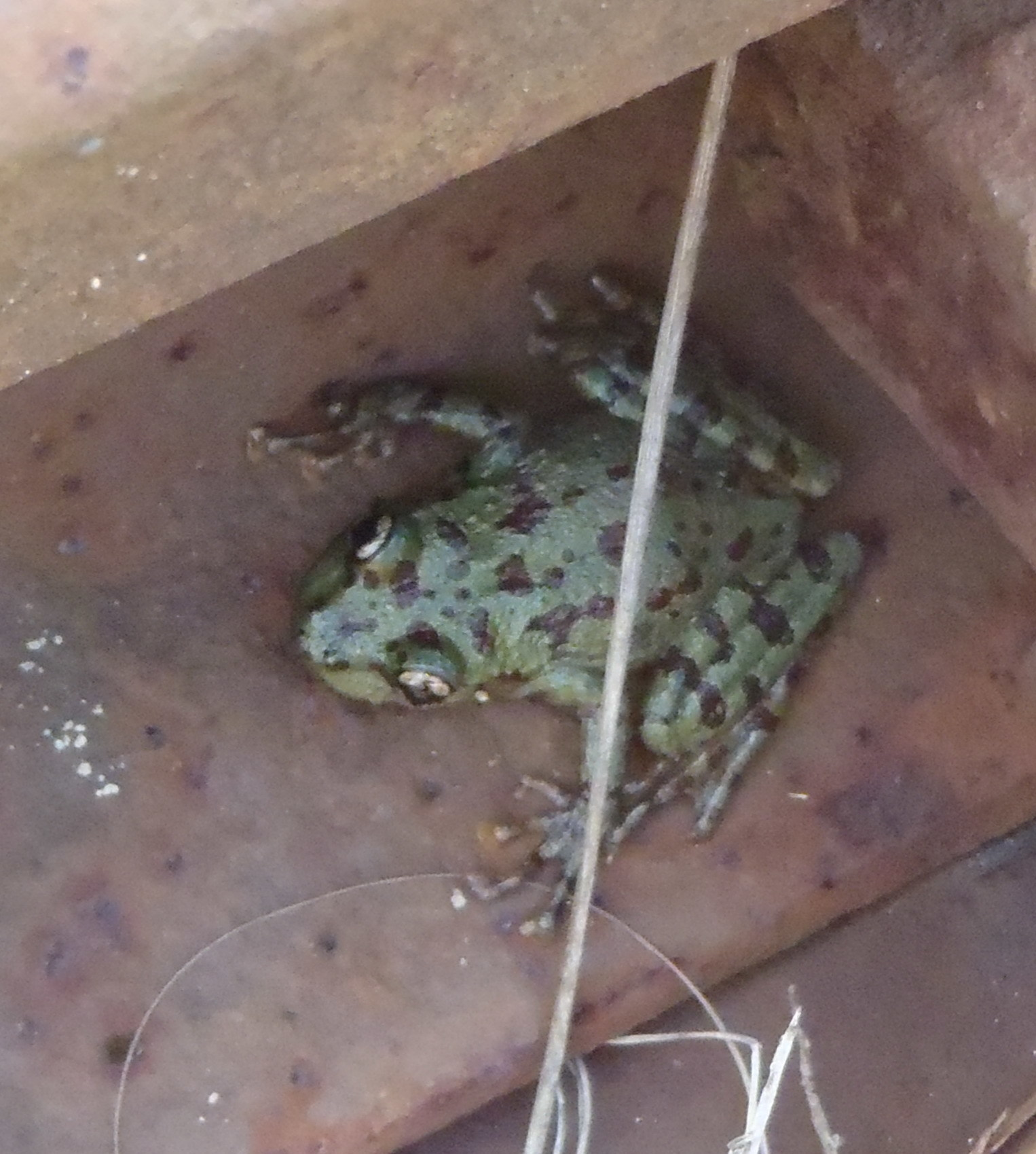

Conservation status
- Least Concern (IUCN 3.1)

Scientific classification
- Kingdom: Animalia
- Phylum: Chordata
- Class: Amphibia
- Order: Anura
- Family: Heleophrynidae
- Genus: Heleophryne
- Species: H. regis

Binomial name
- Heleophryne regis Hewitt, 1910

= Royal ghost frog =

Species of amphibian

The royal ghost frog (Heleophryne regis), also known as the southern ghost frog or Cape ghost frog, is a species of frog in the family Heleophrynidae. It is endemic to South Africa, and lives in fast-moving streams.

== Description ==
Ghost frogs get their name as one of the six species found in Skeleton Gorge (on Table Mountain), South Africa. The underside of the body, including the jaw, has small hooks, which help the frogs climb over wet rocks near their habitats. The frogs measure 35–45 mm (1.4–1.8 in) in length. It is in the same size range as Hewitt's ghost frog, but is smaller than Purcell's ghost frog. The top side of its body is brown with yellow spots, and the underside is white. The limbs are plain-colored, and flesh-colored underneath. Their tadpoles take up to two years to develop fully. The call of the royal ghost frog is a harsh, creaking sound, given at around one call per second.

== Habitat ==
All species of ghost frogs are endemic to the southern tip of Africa. Its natural habitat is fynbos heathland in the Western and Eastern provinces of South Africa, and specifically cool mountain streams at an altitude of 230–790 metres (750–2,590 ft).

It is threatened by habitat loss, as it requires clean, fast-moving water in which to live. However, the International Union for Conservation of Nature classes the species as Least Concern; although it lives in an area of less than 20,000 square kilometres (7,700 sq mi), the habitat is not currently threatened, and the species is presumed to have a large population. Threats to its habitat include siltation of the freshwater streams.
