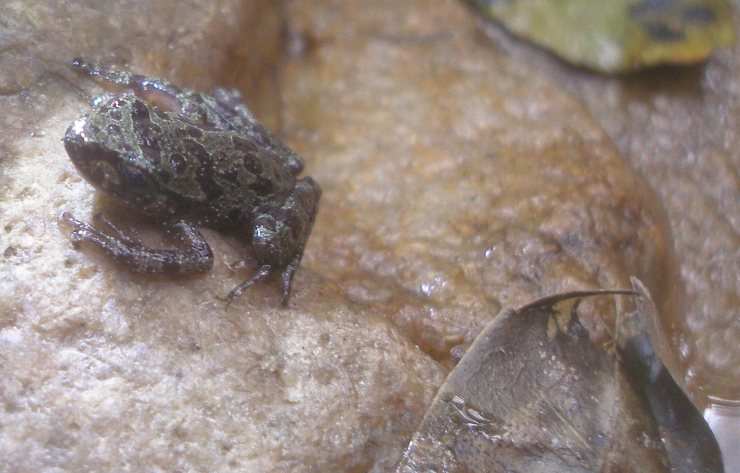

Conservation status
- Least Concern (IUCN 3.1)

Scientific classification
- Kingdom: Animalia
- Phylum: Chordata
- Class: Amphibia
- Order: Anura
- Family: Heleophrynidae
- Genus: Heleophryne
- Species: H. orientalis

Binomial name
- Heleophryne orientalis FitzSimons, 1946

= Eastern ghost frog =

Species of amphibian

The eastern ghost frog (Heleophryne orientalis) is a species of frog in the family Heleophrynidae.

It is endemic to Western Cape Province, South Africa. Its natural habitats are forest patches surrounded by mountain fynbos heathland. Adult frogs live near slow-to-swift-flowing perennial mountain streams in isolated canyons. They are typical sit-and-wait predators that hunt at night near the splash zone of the mountain streams. Breeding takes place in fast-flowing, perennial streams. Clutches of 120–190 eggs are laid in extra-aquatic under moss-covered rocks. Like many frogs, their muscles and internal organs are visible due to their lower body being transparent. Distinguished within its taxonomic group, this species is well-known for its exceptional anatomical traits. Most prominently observed during the tadpole stage, their unique pigmentation sets them apart from other Heleophryids, capturing attention and fascination among researchers and enthusiasts alike. Their tadpoles take two years to complete their development and possess unique larval features such as the appearance of both the mandibular and the rostral cartilage.

The eastern ghost frog is a locally common species that is not significantly threatened, but is locally impacted by introduced species.
