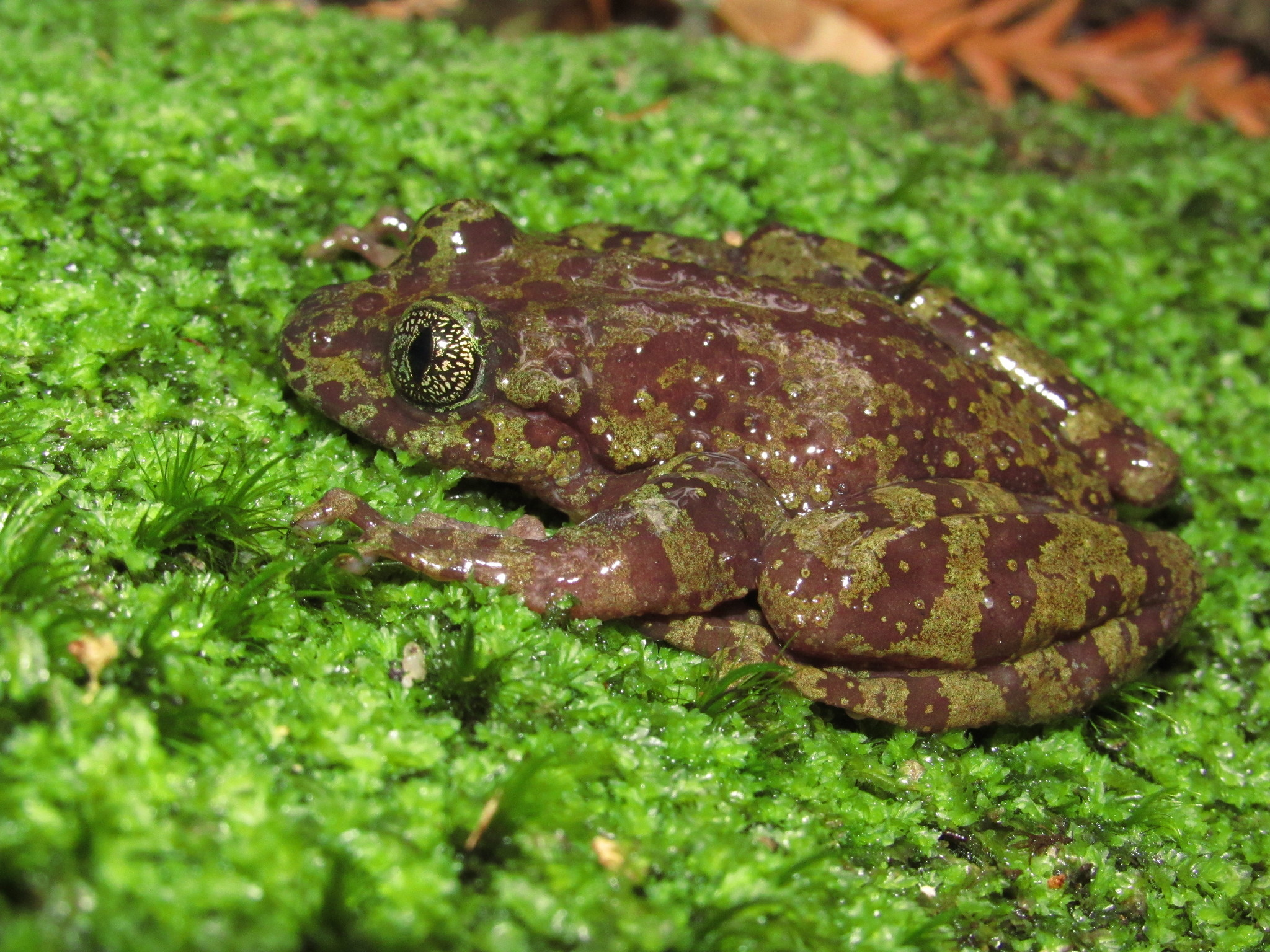
- Table Mountain ghost frog (Heleophryne rosei)

Scientific classification
- Domain: Eukaryota
- Kingdom: Animalia
- Phylum: Chordata
- Class: Amphibia
- Order: Anura
- Family: Heleophrynidae
- Genus: Heleophryne; Sclater, 1898

Species
- See text

= Heleophryne =

Genus of amphibians

Heleophryne is a genus of ghost frogs. They are known from mountainous regions of South Africa, Lesotho, and Eswatini.

One member of the genus, the Table Mountain ghost frog (H. rosei) is considered an EDGE species.

== Species ==
The following species are classified in this genus:

- Cederberg ghost frog (Heleophryne depressa) FitzSimons, 1946
- Hewitt's ghost frog (Heleophryne hewitti) Boycott, 1988
- Eastern ghost frog (Heleophryne orientalis) FitzSimons, 1946
- Purcell's ghost frog (Heleophryne purcelli) Sclater, 1898
- Royal ghost frog (Heleophryne regis) Hewitt, 1910
- Rose's ghost frog (Heleophryne rosei) Hewitt, 1925
