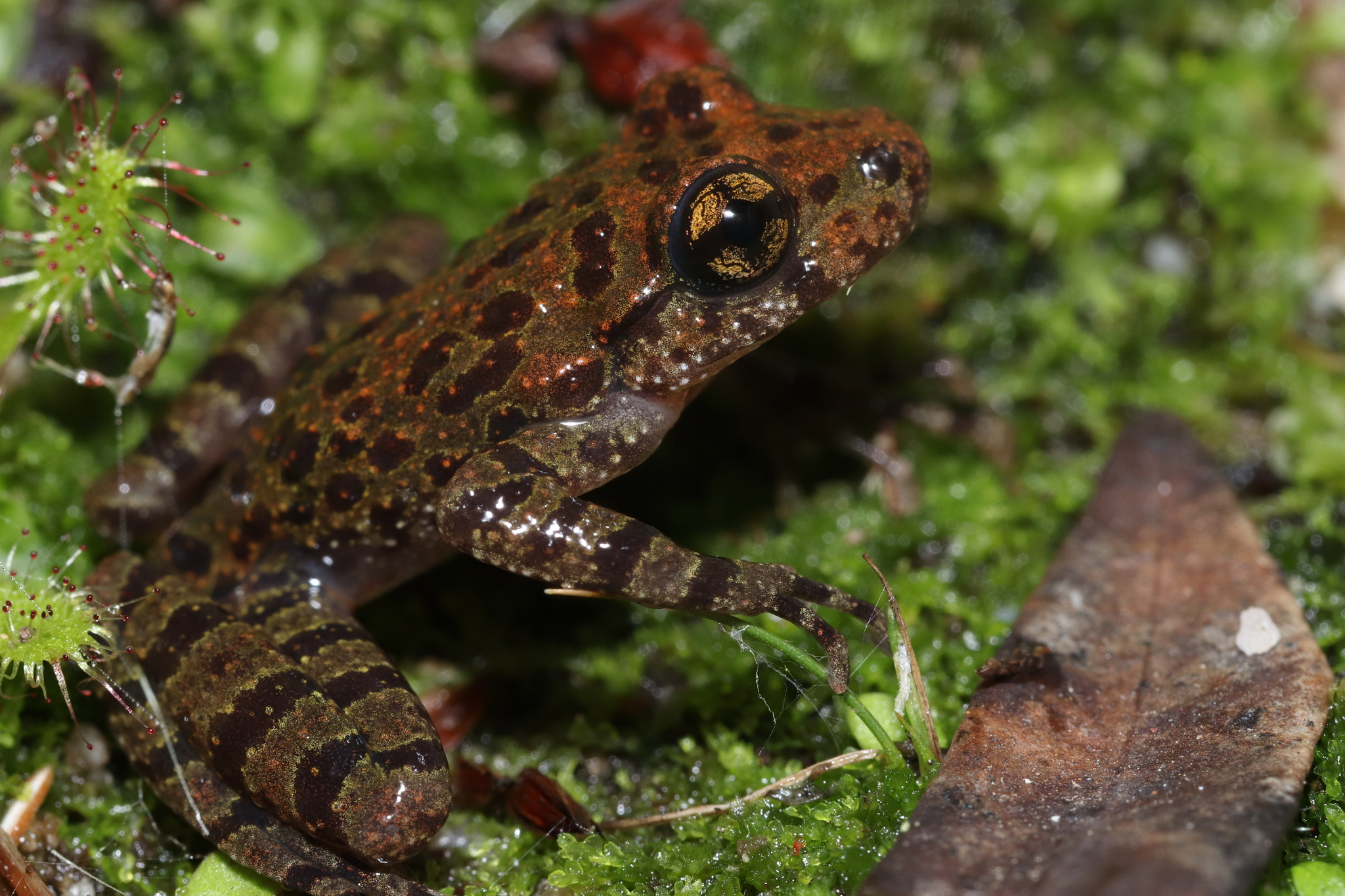

Conservation status
- Least Concern (IUCN 3.1)

Scientific classification
- Kingdom: Animalia
- Phylum: Chordata
- Class: Amphibia
- Order: Anura
- Family: Heleophrynidae
- Genus: Heleophryne
- Species: H. depressa

Binomial name
- Heleophryne depressa FitzSimons, 1946

= Cederberg ghost frog =

Species of amphibian

The Cederberg ghost frog (Heleophryne depressa), also known as the Hex River ghost frog or Hex River torrent frog, is a species of frog in the family Heleophrynidae. It is endemic to the Western Cape Province of South Africa, living in the Cederberg mountain range.
