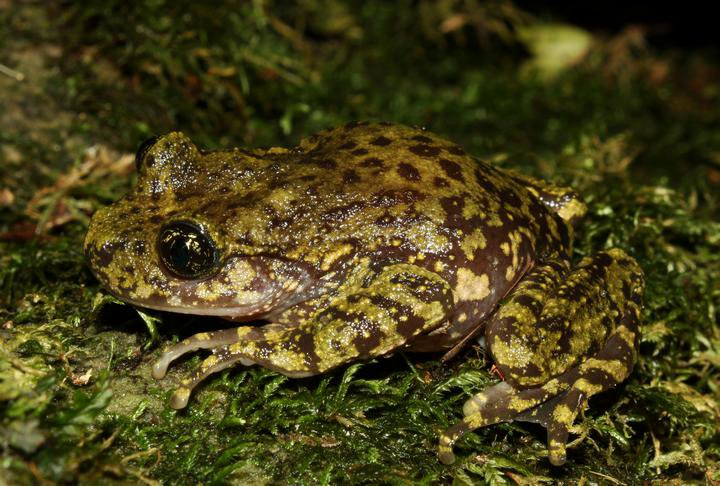

Conservation status
- Least Concern (IUCN 3.1)

Scientific classification
- Kingdom: Animalia
- Phylum: Chordata
- Class: Amphibia
- Order: Anura
- Family: Heleophrynidae
- Genus: Hadromophryne; Van Dijk, 2008
- Species: H. natalensis

Binomial name
- Hadromophryne natalensis (Hewitt, 1913)

Synonyms
- Heleophryne natalensis Hewitt, 1913

= Natal ghost frog =

Species of amphibian

The Natal ghost frog (Hadromophryne natalensis) is a species of frog in the family Heleophrynidae. It is the only species in the genus Hadromophryne.

Hadromophryne natalensis is found in Lesotho, South Africa, and Eswatini. It is a common species inhabiting montane forests and grasslands. It lives and breeds in and around fast-flowing, perennial mountain streams generally above waterfalls that limit access of fish. Adults live in rock crevices in cascades or in the riparian zone along streams. The larvae have broad, suctorial mouthparts and a streamlined form with a muscular tail allowing them to feed and maintain their position in torrent streams. They feed on algal films and detritus on rocks in torrent streams. Larval development takes up to two years therefore permanent streams are required for reproduction. It is potentially threatened by modifications of its habitat caused by afforestation, damming and siltation of streams, and water extraction. It is also negatively affected by the introduced trout.

== Gallery ==
A tadpole collected in Durban
