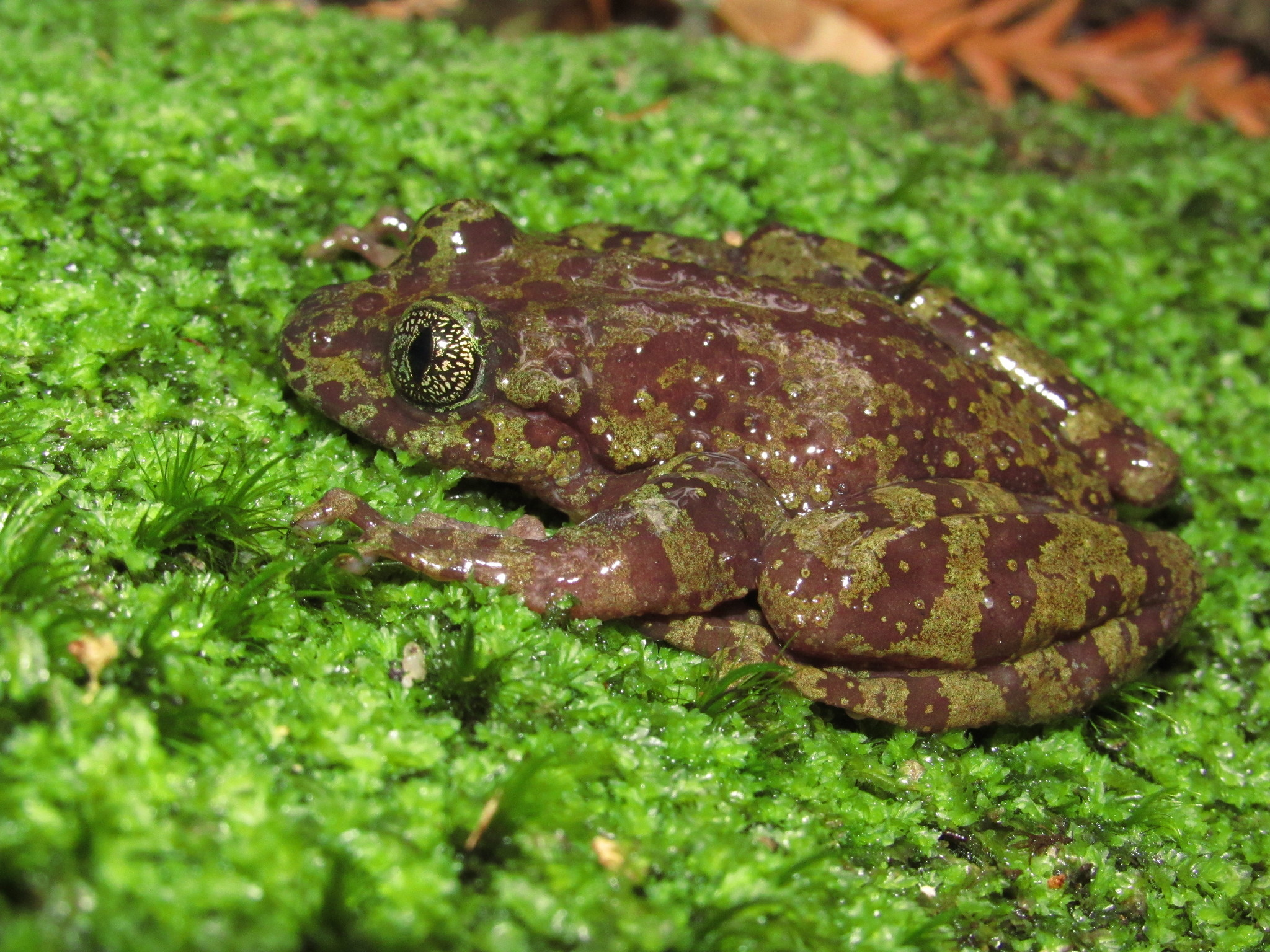

Conservation status
- Endangered (IUCN 3.1)

Scientific classification
- Kingdom: Animalia
- Phylum: Chordata
- Class: Amphibia
- Order: Anura
- Family: Heleophrynidae
- Genus: Heleophryne
- Species: H. rosei

Binomial name
- Heleophryne rosei Hewitt, 1925
- Rose's ghost frog distribution according to the IUCN. Extant (resident)

= Rose's ghost frog =

Species of amphibian endemic to South Africa

Rose's ghost frog (Heleophryne rosei), or Table Mountain ghost frog, is a species of frog in the family Heleophrynidae endemic to South Africa. It is a medium-sized species with purple or brown blotches on a pale green background and large discs on its fingers and toes. It has a very restricted range, being only known from the slopes of parts of Table Mountain. The tadpoles live in permanent streams but these are in danger of drying up because of the establishment of pine plantations. Because of its small range and changes in its habitat, this frog is listed as endangered by the International Union for Conservation of Nature.

== Description ==
This is a moderately sized frog, with the larger female up to 60 mm (2.4 in) and the smaller male up to 50 mm (2.0 in) in length. The colouration of adults is striking, often a pale green background with purple to brown blotches. The fingers and toes have large, triangular terminal discs. A rudimentary thumb is present as a distinct inner metacarpal tubercle. The feet are half webbed, with one phalanx of the fifth toe free of web. The tadpole has neither an upper nor lower jaw sheath, but up to 17 rows of posterior labial teeth. The tadpole also has a large oral disc and is able to climb up wet vertical rock faces.

== Distribution ==
This species is known only from the southern, eastern, and marginally western slopes of Table Mountain in Cape Town.

== Habitat ==
The typical habitat of this frog includes moist, forested gorges, with vertical rock faces to more exposed streams surrounded by dense marginal vegetation, the latter habitat usually found at higher altitudes. Tadpoles require year-round supply of water whereas adults can stray away from streams, even to be found in caves.

== Behaviour ==
The frogs are found on rock ledges or up in vegetation at night, retreating under large rocks and in cracks of rocks during the day.

== Diet ==
These frogs eat a range of small insects and other forest arthropods.

== Reproduction ==
Breeding starts in November when the streams are low but the temperature is high. The male's secondary sexual characteristics include a number of small black spines on the outside surfaces of the forearms, on the back, and on the top of the back legs. The eggs have not been found, but in other species they are deposited under rocks in streams. The tadpoles develop for about 12 months.

== Conservation status ==
This species is listed as endangered by the International Union for Conservation of Nature (IUCN) and in the South African Red Data Book. The population is small, geographically restricted, and threatened by the plantations of pines on the mountain that cause the streams to dry up. Many of the streams historically populated by Heleophryne rosei were diverted during the 1900s in order to supply the newly built reservoirs on Table Mountain. Due to the ancient, Mesozoic origin of the family Heleophrynidae and their evolutionary significance, H. rosei is listed as #11 on the list of the top amphibian EDGE species.
