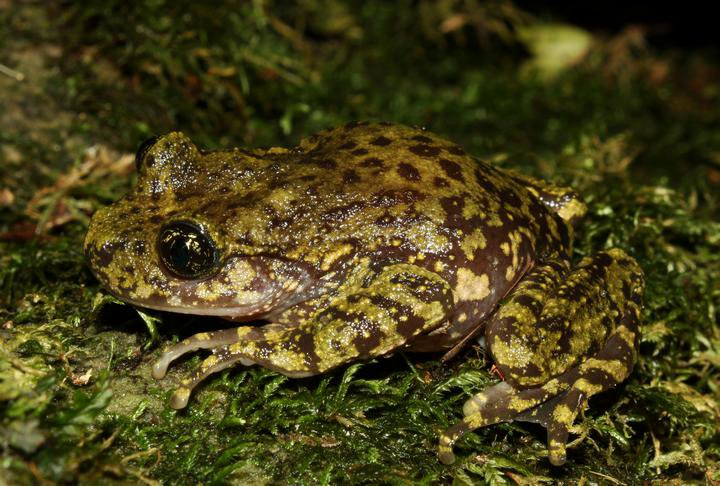
- Natal ghost frog (Hadromophryne natalensis)

Scientific classification
- Kingdom: Animalia
- Phylum: Chordata
- Class: Amphibia
- Order: Anura
- Suborder: Neobatrachia
- Family: Heleophrynidae; Noble, 1931

Genera
- Hadromophryne Van Dijk, 2008; Heleophryne Sclater, 1898
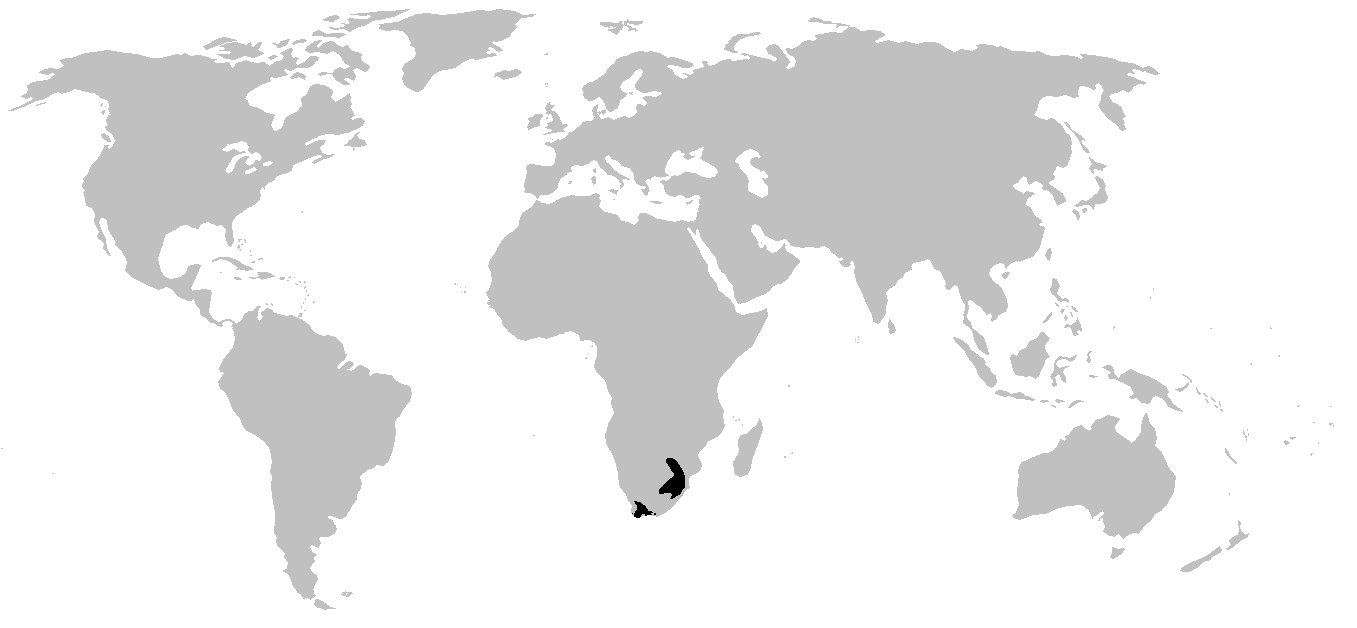
- Distribution of Heleophrynidae (in black)

= Ghost frog =

Family of amphibians

Heleophrynidae is a family of frogs, commonly known as ghost frogs. They are thought to be the sister lineage to all other groups in the Neobatrachia. The family consists of two genera, Heleophryne and Hadromophryne, with seven species. Ghost frogs live in swift-moving mountain streams in South Africa. The common name of "ghost frogs" may have been coined because of their occurrence in Skeleton Gorge.

== Taxonomy ==
The ghost frogs were formerly thought to be closely related to the Sooglossidae of the Seychelles (which are now thought to be a sister group to Ranoidea), or to the Australian Myobatrachidae, which are now thought to be a sister group to Hyloidea. In contrast, more recent taxonomic studies place them as being sister to all other extant Neobatrachia and having no close relatives, having diverged from the rest of the Neobatrachia during the Early Cretaceous, about 140 million years ago.

Family Heleophrynidae

- Genus Hadromophryne Van Dijk, 2008
  - Natal ghost frog, Hadromophryne natalensis Hewitt, 1913
- Genus Heleophryne Sclater, 1898
  - Cederberg ghost frog, Heleophryne depressa FitzSimons, 1946
  - Hewitt's ghost frog, Heleophryne hewitti Boycott, 1988
  - Eastern ghost frog, Heleophryne orientalis FitzSimons, 1946
  - Purcell's ghost frog, Heleophryne purcelli Sclater, 1898
  - Royal ghost frog, Heleophryne regis Hewitt, 1910
  - Rose's ghost frog, Heleophryne rosei Hewitt, 1925

== Biology ==
Ghost frogs have morphological adaptations suited to surviving on the rocks around these streams. They only come out on full moons. They are medium-sized frogs, reaching a length of 6 cm (2.4 in), with flat bodies, enabling them to climb inside rocky crevices. They have very large toe discs in comparison to their size, which helps to cling onto rocks. With the help of the labial teeth the tadpoles contain in their mouths, the mouthparts are modified into sucking discs, to allow them to cling to substrates, and remain still while they are feeding.

== EDGE endangered species ==
On January 21, 2008, Evolutionarily Distinct and Globally Endangered (EDGE) identified nature's most "weird, wonderful and endangered species", stating that "the EDGE amphibians are amongst the most remarkable and unusual species on the planet and yet an alarming 85% of the top 100 are receiving little or no conservation attention." Due to the very ancient origins and deep genetic divergence of Heleophrynidae, the Table Mountain ghost frog (Heleophryne rosei) was listed as #11 on the list.
