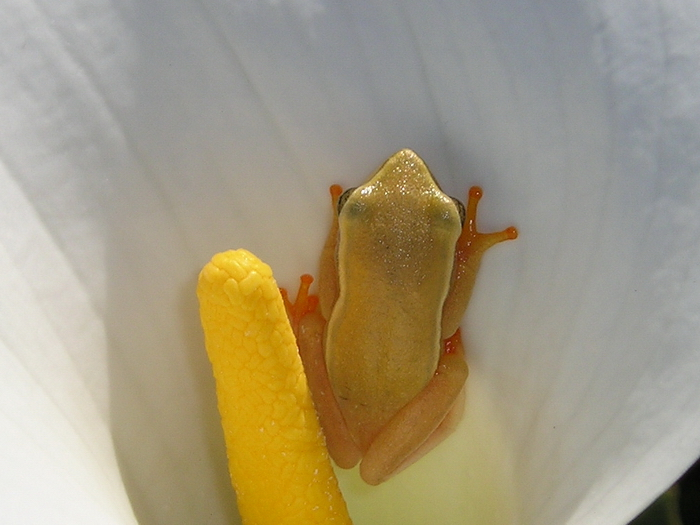

Conservation status
- Least Concern (IUCN 3.1)

Scientific classification
- Kingdom: Animalia
- Phylum: Chordata
- Class: Amphibia
- Order: Anura
- Family: Hyperoliidae
- Genus: Hyperolius
- Species: H. horstockii

Binomial name
- Hyperolius horstockii (Schlegel, 1837)

Synonyms
- Hyla horstockii Schlegel, 1837

= Arum frog =

Arum lily reed frog

Species of amphibian

The arum frog, arum lily reed frog, Horstock's arum-frog, arum lily frog, or Horstock's reed frog (Hyperolius horstockii) is a species of frog in the family Hyperoliidae. It is endemic to South Africa.

== Identification ==
Adults grow to 40 mm in length. They have bright orange feet and can change their colour to camouflage themselves. The top of the body is cream to brown, sometimes with small black spots. A distinctive, pale, dorsolateral line runs from the snout along the flanks, with a dark-brown lateral band underneath. A fine, dark line usually separates the pale line from the brown band. The concealed surfaces of limbs, webbing, and discs are orange to red. Underneath, the frog is creamy white and slightly granular. The gular flap in males is bright ochre. their pupils are horizontal.

Tadpoles reach 40 mm. They are brown with longitudinal, darker bands on their tails.

== Distribution and habitat ==
The arum frog is found in the southern coastal plain of South Africa from Cape Town in the Western Cape to Port Elizabeth in the Eastern Cape.

Its natural habitats are Mediterranean-type shrubby vegetation, rivers, swamps, intermittent freshwater lakes, freshwater marshes, intermittent freshwater marshes, and ponds. It is frequently found lying at the bottom of arum lilies (Zantedeschia aethiopica), trying to catch pollinating insects.

It is assessed as least concern but some populations are threatened by habitat loss through the invasion of alien vegetation and fire. Contrary to popular belief it is not threatened by the collection and sale of arum lilies.

== Behaviour ==
These frogs are sometimes found in arum lily flowers where they can change colour to perfectly match their surroundings. This makes them virtually invisible to predators, as well as to their insect prey. Their pale colour camouflages them in the white flowers, helped by hiding their bright orange feet and legs under their bodies during the day. Contrary to popular belief they do not use the pollen of the flowers to camouflage themselves.

The breeding habitat of the arum frog includes large or small pans, dams, vleis and slow-flowing, quiet streams where there is sufficient emergent vegetation. Males usually call at night from elevated positions above water, normally in the emergent vegetation such as sedges, reeds, shrubs and grasses, although they may sometimes call from the pads of water lilies. The usually start calling just after sunset, but will call sporadically in the late afternoon on cloudy, rainy days. The arum frog occurs mostly in a winter rainfall region; however, its breeding season occurs over the spring and summer, in September–January. After mating the female lays clutches of 10–30 eggs which are attached to the submerged roots and stems of plants.
