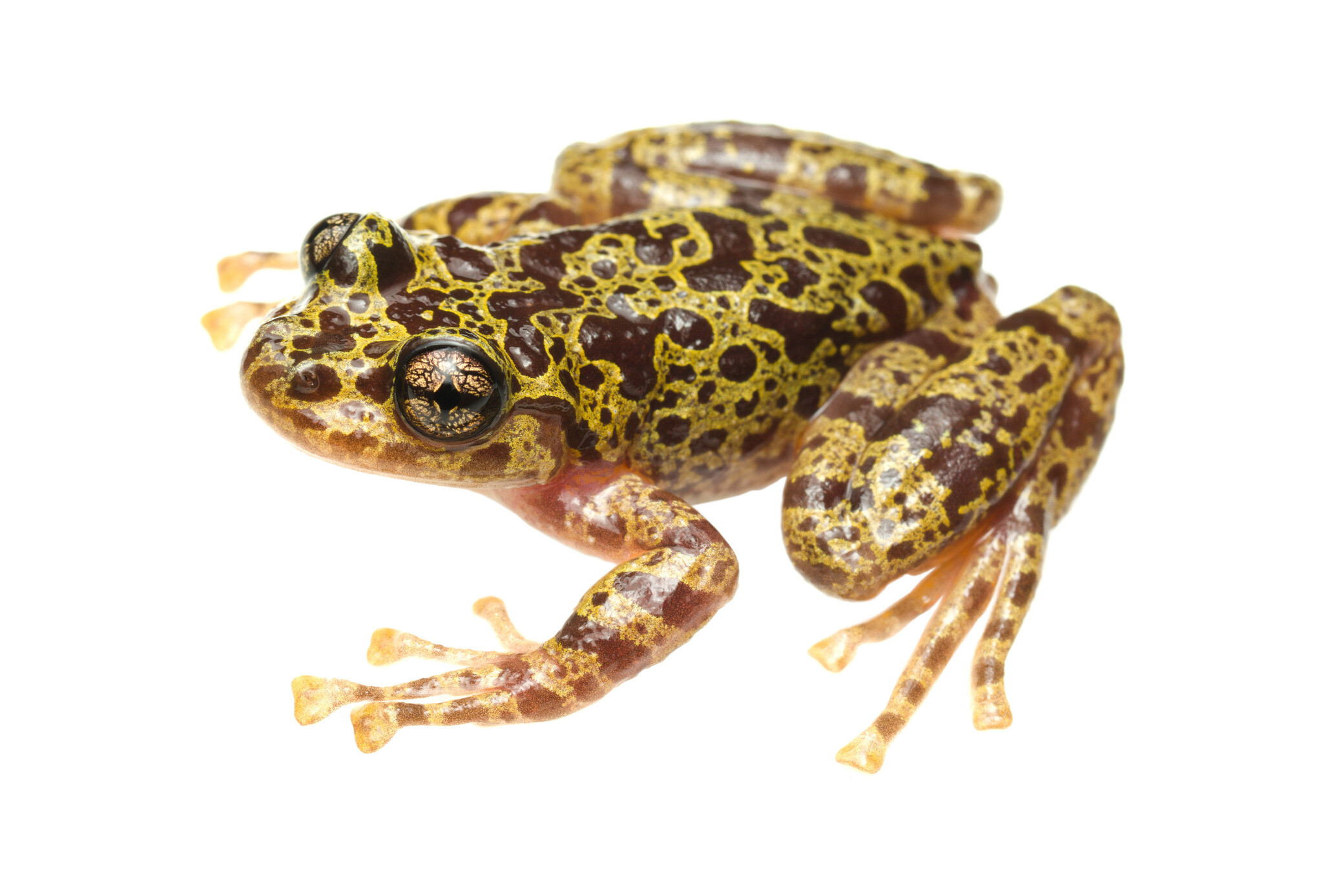

Conservation status
- Endangered (IUCN 3.1)

Scientific classification
- Kingdom: Animalia
- Phylum: Chordata
- Class: Amphibia
- Order: Anura
- Family: Heleophrynidae
- Genus: Heleophryne
- Species: H. hewitti

Binomial name
- Heleophryne hewitti Boycott, 1988
- Hewitt's ghost frog range Extant (resident)

= Hewitt's ghost frog =

Species of amphibian

The Hewitt's ghost frog (Heleophryne hewitti) is a species of frog in the family Heleophrynidae. It is endemic to Eastern Cape Province, South Africa. Its natural habitat is fynbos heathland and grassy fynbos. Adults are difficult to see but live in or near fast-flowing perennial rivers and streams where they also breed. Each female lays up to 200 eggs. Tadpoles are more readily seen and take two years to develop fully.

Hewitt's ghost frog has a very restricted range: it is known from in total five rivers, four in the Elandsberg mountains and one in the Cockscomb mountains. Only small remnants of fynbos survive within its range, and it is threatened by habitat loss caused by afforestation, fires, erosion, siltation of streams, dams, and roads. Introduced predatory fish are probably also a threat.
