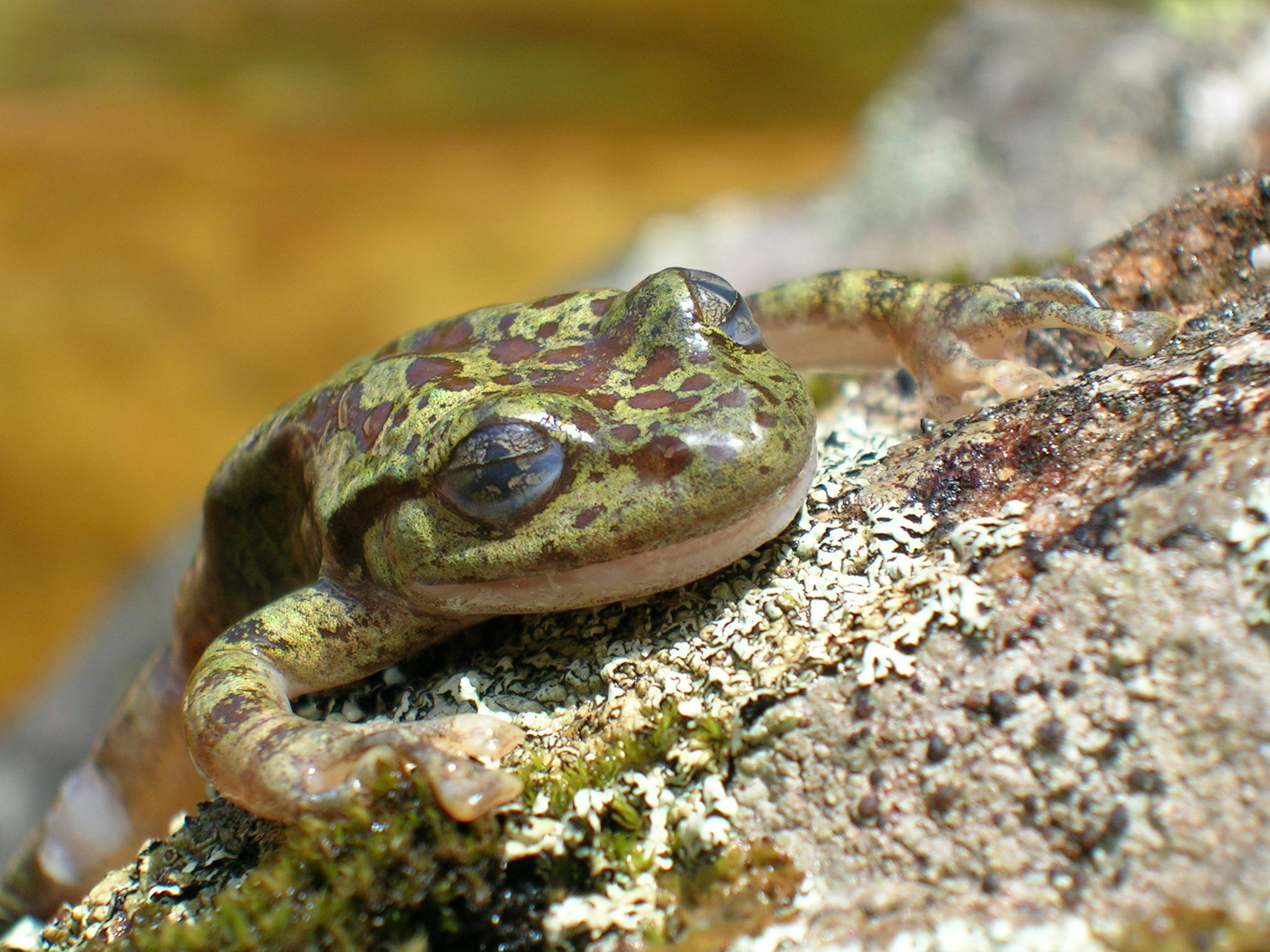

Conservation status
- Least Concern (IUCN 3.1)

Scientific classification
- Kingdom: Animalia
- Phylum: Chordata
- Class: Amphibia
- Order: Anura
- Family: Heleophrynidae
- Genus: Heleophryne
- Species: H. purcelli

Binomial name
- Heleophryne purcelli Sclater, 1898

= Purcell's ghost frog =

Species of amphibian

The Purcell's ghost frog (Heleophryne purcelli) is a species of frog in the family Heleophrynidae. It is endemic to Western Cape Province, South Africa. Its natural habitat is fynbos heathland. Breeding takes place in perennial streams. Their tadpoles take two years to develop fully.

Purcell's ghost frog is a common species that is not significantly threatened, although it is locally affected by introduced species.
