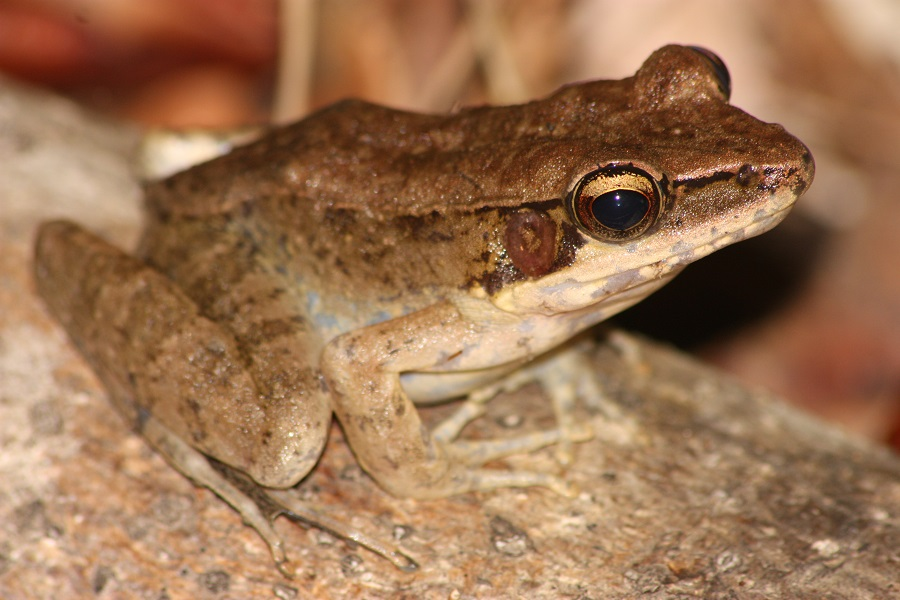
- Australian wood frog

Scientific classification
- Kingdom: Animalia
- Phylum: Chordata
- Class: Amphibia
- Order: Anura
- Superfamily: Ranoidea
- Clade: Natatanura; Frost et al., 2006

Families
- See text

= Natatanura =

Clade of amphibians

Natatanura is a clade of frogs in the suborder Neobatrachia. The group has a cosmopolitan distribution and is found on every continent except Antarctica. It is the sister clade to Afrobatrachia within the superfamily Ranoidea.

The group includes the most widely distributed frog family Ranidae, as well as the largest extant species of frog, the goliath frog in the family Conrauidae.

== Taxonomy ==
Families:

- Ceratobatrachidae
- Conrauidae - slippery frogs, giant frogs
- Dicroglossidae – fork-tongued frogs
- Micrixalidae – dancing frogs
- Mantellidae – Malagasy frogs
- Nyctibatrachidae – night frogs
- Odontobatrachidae
- Petropedetidae – torrent frogs
- Phrynobatrachidae – puddle frogs
- Ptychadenidae – grassland frogs
- Pyxicephalidae
- Ranidae – true frogs
- Ranixalidae – Indian frogs
- Rhacophoridae – shrub frogs, bush frogs, moss frogs
