= Conraua robusta =

Conservation status
- Vulnerable (IUCN 3.1)

Scientific classification
- Kingdom: Animalia
- Phylum: Chordata
- Class: Amphibia
- Order: Anura
- Family: Conrauidae
- Genus: Conraua
- Species: C. robusta

Binomial name
- Conraua robusta Nieden, 1908

Synonyms
- Rana (Conraua) niedeni Parker, 1936 – replacement name when placed in Rana

Species of amphibian

Conraua robusta, the robust giant frog or Cameroon slippery frog, is a species of frog in the family Conrauidae found in western Cameroon and eastern Nigeria. This species is congeneric to the goliath frog, the largest known frog species in the world.

== Description ==
Male Conraua robusta grow to a snout–vent length of 140 mm (5.5 in) and females to 122 mm (4.8 in). The body is long and compact. The snout is short and rounded. The head is broad and flat. The dorsum is densely covered with small, round warts. The legs are muscular and covered with numerous parallel ridges. The toe tips have large oval discs. The body varies dorsally from beige to olive to brown with irregular black patterning, turning to almost uniformly black in old individuals. The venter is white or black, especially on the throat, .chest, and towards the knees.

== Habitat ==
Conraua robusta occurs in and near cold, fast-flowing streams in both grassland and forest areas at elevations of 750–1,400 m (2,460–4,590 ft) above sea level; it does not require tree cover and can be found in some urban areas. It is predominantly nocturnal. The tadpoles live in fast, even torrential, water. It is sympatric with C. crassipes and C. goliath in parts of its range; it prefers colder, faster water than the latter.

== Conservation ==
Conraua robusta is an uncommon species that is probably negatively affected by habitat loss and deterioration caused by agriculture, logging, and human settlements. The impacts include sedimentation of the streams it inhabits. It is also harvested for food, but at levels that are sustainable; there is ongoing work to ensure that the harvest continues to be sustainable. This species is found in the Cross River National Park (Nigeria).
