= Conraua derooi =

Conservation status
- Critically Endangered (IUCN 3.1)

Scientific classification
- Kingdom: Animalia
- Phylum: Chordata
- Class: Amphibia
- Order: Anura
- Family: Conrauidae
- Genus: Conraua
- Species: C. derooi

Binomial name
- Conraua derooi Hulselmans, 1972

Species of amphibian

Conraua derooi is a species of frog in the family Conrauidae. It is found in the Togo-Volta Highlands along the border of Togo and Ghana, where it is possibly endemic. The common name Togo slippery frog has been coined for this species. Previously feared to be extinct, a few populations were found in surveys between 2005 and 2007, after the species had gone unrecorded for more than 20 years.

== Etymology ==
The specific name derooi honours Antoon De Roo, a Belgian ornithologist who was part of the expedition that discovered the species.

== Distribution ==
Conraua derooi is found in southwestern Togo and adjacent southeastern Ghana on the Togo-Volta Highlands, as well as in the Atewa Range in central Ghana. Records of Conraua alleni from eastern Ghana and Togo refer to this species. The type locality is Missahoé in western Togo.

== Description ==
Conraua derooi are large frogs (though much smaller than their relative, the goliath frog Conraua goliath), with males measuring 76–84 mm (3.0–3.3 in) and females about 74–82 mm (2.9–3.2 in) in snout–vent length. The head is relatively large with prominent eyes and a fairly small snout. The tympanum is not visible externally. The hindlimbs are very long and robust. The toes are long and have distinct adhesive discs and webbing extending midway to the discs. The forelimbs are short but muscular with webbed fingers.

== Habitat and conservation ==
Conraua derooi lives in flowing water in forest habitats; they are permanently aquatic. The tadpoles develop in streams.

At the time of the latest assessment by the International Union for Conservation of Nature (IUCN) in 2004, only one surviving population was believed to exist. However, surveys in 2005–2007 located a few populations in Ghana and Togo, after the species had gone unrecorded for more than 20 years. Nevertheless, the species is extremely threatened by habitat destruction and alteration, as well as by human consumption. Further, there is genetic differentiation between the Atewa and Volta populations. Populations within the Atewa Range Forest Reserve seem large and viable; these are probably the largest remaining populations.
