= Conraua beccarii =

Conservation status
- Least Concern (IUCN 3.1)

Scientific classification
- Kingdom: Animalia
- Phylum: Chordata
- Class: Amphibia
- Order: Anura
- Family: Conrauidae
- Genus: Conraua
- Species: C. beccarii

Binomial name
- Conraua beccarii (Boulenger, 1911)

Species of frog

Conraua beccarii is a species of frog in the family Conrauidae found in Eritrea and Ethiopia. Its natural habitats are subtropical or tropical moist montane forest, subtropical or tropical dry lowland grassland, subtropical or tropical high-altitude grassland, rivers, and freshwater marshes. It is threatened by habitat loss.

== See also ==
Genetic Relative: Goliath Frog
