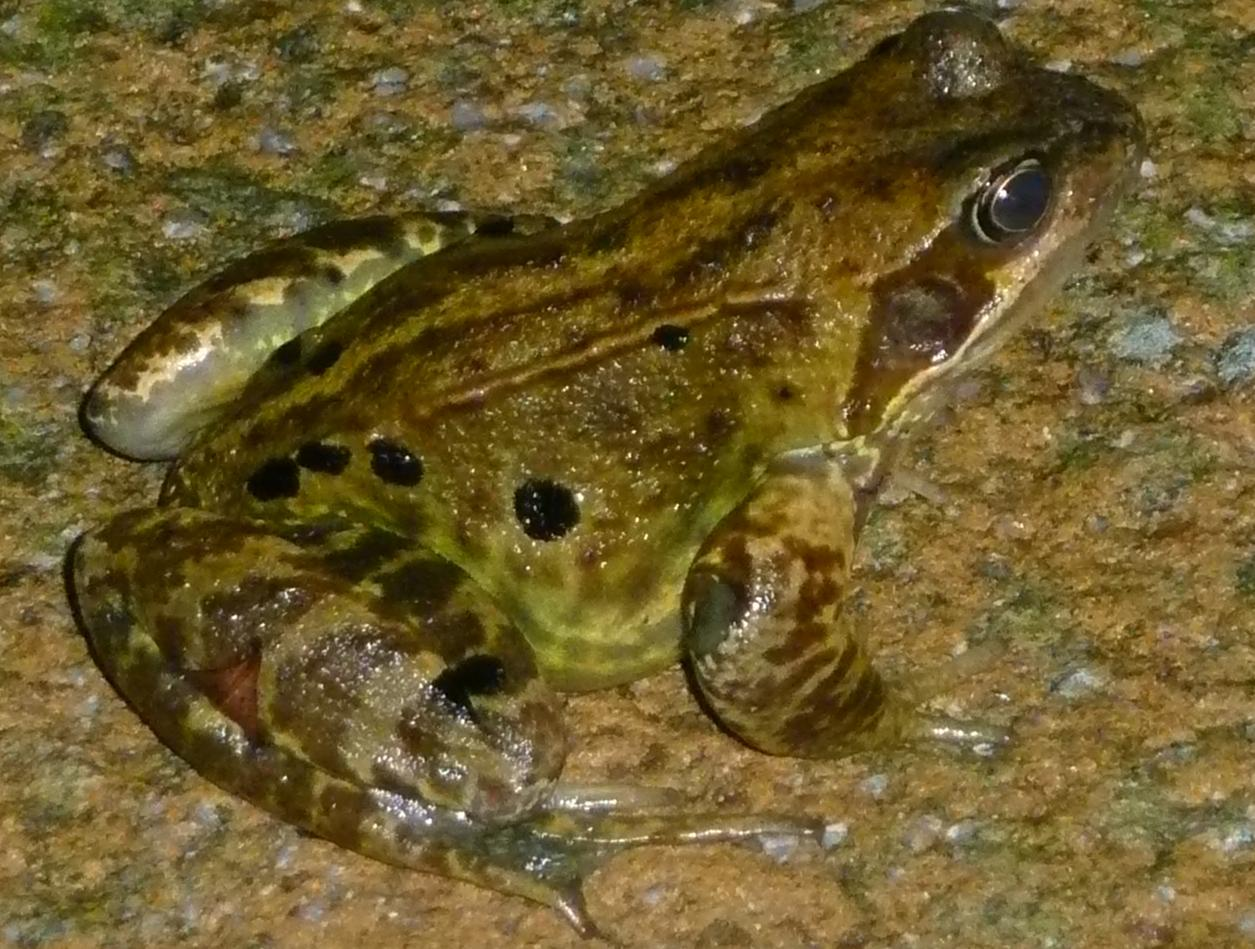
- Common frog, Rana temporaria

Scientific classification
- Kingdom: Animalia
- Phylum: Chordata
- Class: Amphibia
- Order: Anura
- Suborder: Neobatrachia
- Clade: Ranoidea

Families
- Arthroleptidae; Brevicipitidae; Ceratobatrachidae; Conrauidae; Dicroglossidae; Ericabatrachidae; Hyperoliidae; Hemisotidae; Mantellidae; Microhylidae; Micrixalidae; Nyctibatrachidae; Petropedetidae; Phrynobatrachidae; Ptychadenidae; Pyxicephalidae; Ranidae; Ranixalidae; Rhacophoridae

= Ranoidea =

Ranoidea Temporal range: Cretaceous–recent, 89.3–0 Ma

Superfamily of frogs

The Ranoidea are a superfamily of frogs in the order Anura. Members of this superfamily are characterised by having the pectoral girdle fused into a single complex unit, having no ribs, and using an axillary grip during amplexus. The larvae have a single spiracle on the left side and complex mouthparts, or in some species, undergo direct development. The taxonomy of these families has been under heavy debate for many years. In recent studies, molecular data has been used to better identify the phylogentic relationships of these frogs, rearranging and introducing new subfamilies to better distinguish between large groups of frogs (Glaw, Vences, 2001).

The Rainodea superfamily is a large group of frogs from the anura order, with 17 subfamilies. Some of these subfamilies are made up of over 300+ species. Most of the frogs belonging to this group are listed under the least concern section of the IUCN red list. However, there is a significant percentage of these frogs listed as data deficient, endangered, or critically endangered. Like most other amphibians, the frogs listed in this group can be particularly vulnerable to environmental change. Some of the largest threats to the frogs in this group include housing and urban development, farming, illegal trade, mining, etc.

. (See figure 1).

== Families ==
The families described in this section are based on Vitt & Caldwell (2014) and van der Meijden (2006).

=== Ranixalidae ===
The family of Ranixalidae (leaping frogs) has one genus containing 10 different species. They can be found in central and southern India. They typically reside in leaf litter and in tropical deciduous forests, near streams and can be found between 200 m and 1100 m in altitude.

=== Mantellidae ===
The family of Mantellidae (Malagasy poison frogs) has 3 different genera with 191 species total. They can be found in Madagascar and Mayotte Island. They are both terrestrial and arboreal frogs and can be found between 800 and 1000 m in altitude.

=== Rhacophoridae ===
The family of Rhacophoridae (Afroasian tree frogs) has two subfamilies, 14 genera, and a total of 321 species. They are found in Sub-Saharan Africa, Madagascar, and South Asia. They are mainly tree frogs. They have intercalary cartilage between their last two phalanges.

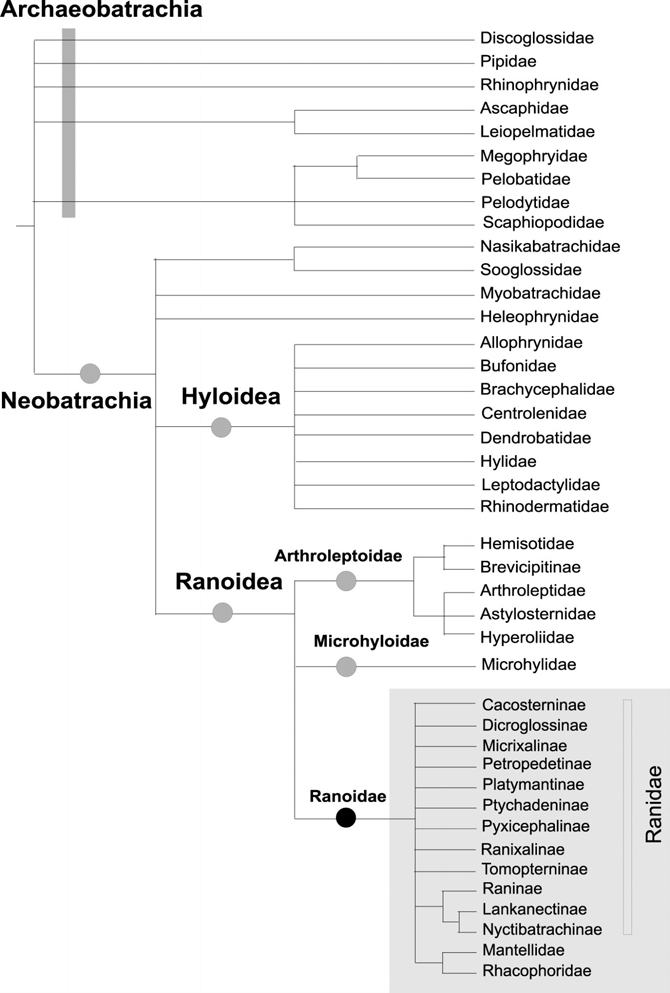
The phylogenetic tree of Ranoidea and other anurans.

=== Pyxicephalidae ===
The family of Pyxicephalidae (African bullfrogs) has two subfamilies, 13 genera, and 68 total species. They are also found in Sub-Saharan Africa. The two subfamilies are completely different in that cacosternines are small and slender typically terrestrial or semiaquatic, whereas pyxicephalines are large bullfrog like frogs that have stocky bodies, with fang like projections on their lower jaw, used to smash their prey.

=== Petropedetidae ===
The family of Petropedetidae (African water frogs and Goliath frog) has two genera with a total of 18 different species. They are found in Sub-Saharan Africa. This family contains the world's largest frog, Conraua goliath.

=== Ericabatrachidae ===
The family Ericabatrachidae contains a single species, the Bale Mountains frog (Ericabatrachus baleensis), endemic to the Bale Mountains in Ethiopia. It was previously included in the family Petropedetidae.

=== Ptychadenidae ===
The family of Ptychadenidae (grassland frogs) has 3 genera with a total of 53 different species. They are found in sub-Saharan Africa. They reside in grasslands and savannas. They tend to have slender bodies with long limbs.

=== Ceratobatrachidae ===
The family of Ceratobatrachidae (triangle frogs) has 5 genera with a total of 84 different species. They can be found in Malaysia, Philippines, Borneo, New Guinea, and the Solomon Islands. Most have very angular bodies and are small to moderate in size. They live in the forests.

=== Brevicipitidae ===
The family of Brevicipitidae (rain frogs) has 5 genera with 34 total species. They can be found in Sub-Saharan African in the south east corner. This species has an average snout-vent length (SVL) of 30-55 mm. They are typically small with spherical shaped bodies, which become even more round when they are disturbed because they inflate themselves as a mode of defense. Males are typically smaller than females, known as sexual dimorphism, and this can prevent a typical amplexus. To solve this, the males have skin secretions that will help in 'gluing' the male to the female's back. Brevicipitidae participate in direct development, which means that there is no larval stage or metamorphosis. The eggs will be placed in subterranean nests, with clutches ranging from 20-50 large eggs.

=== Hemisotidae ===
The family of Hemisotidae (Shovel-Nosed Frogs) has one genus, with a total of nine species. They are located in Africa, just south of the Sahara. This species is largely located in Savannas, but they can also live in scrub and gallery forests. Hemisotidae can range from 22-52 mm in SVL, and they are referred to as headfirst burrowers. This means that they bury themselves into the ground using their snout by moving their head up and down. They will also use their forelimbs to throw soil to the rear, and use their hind limbs to push themselves further into the ground. They will typically scavenge for food both above and below the ground, usually feeding on soft-bodied arthropods and worms. For reproduction, these frogs will mate during the heavy rains of the wet season, or right before the rains arrive. A male and female will position themselves in inguinal amplexus, in which a male amphibian clasps a female around her waist (inguinal region) using his forelimbs. Hemisotidae will have clutches ranging from 100-250 eggs, and the female will dig a chamber near an ephemeral pool. The female will typically remain with the eggs until they hatch, in which she will then guide the tadpoles to the nearby pool.
