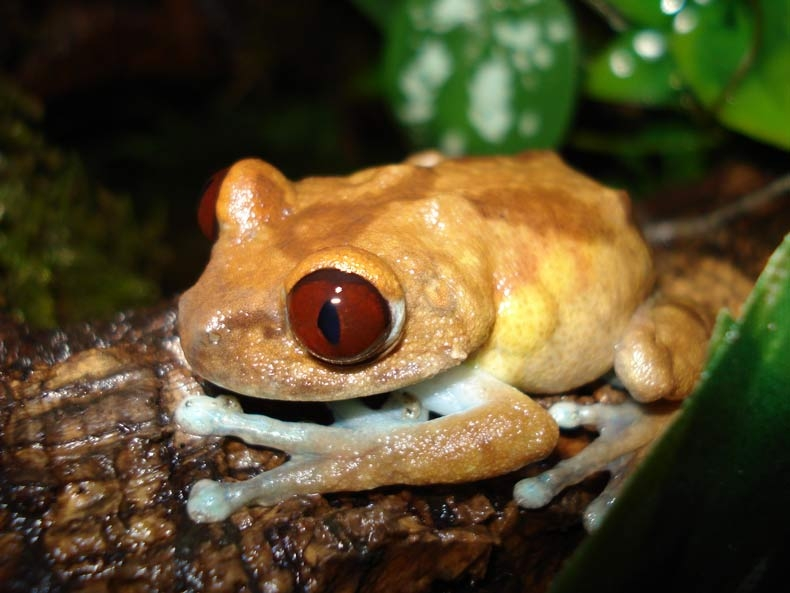
- Leptopelis uluguruensis

Scientific classification
- Kingdom: Animalia
- Phylum: Chordata
- Class: Amphibia
- Order: Anura
- Clade: Ranoidea
- Clade: Afrobatrachia; Frost et al., 2006

Families
- Arthroleptidae; Brevicipitidae; Hemisotidae; Hyperoliidae

= Afrobatrachia =

Clade of frogs

Afrobatrachia is a clade of frogs in the suborder Neobatrachia, all of which are restricted to Africa, including some species in Madagascar and the Seychelles. It is the sister group to the clade Natatanura, which contains all other members of Ranoidea aside from Microhylidae

The diversity of the clade represents more than half the frog diversity found in Africa. Some can grow up to 66 mm in length. Species of the clade in lowland and montane forests display ecologies such as arboreality and fossoriality. The frogs show direct development, the most terrestrial of which is shown the family Brevicipitidae.

== Families ==
- Arthroleptidae Mivart, 1869 (8 genera)
- Brevicipitidae Bonaparte, 1850 (5 genera)
- Hemisotidae Cope, 1867 (1 genus)
- Hyperoliidae Laurent, 1943 (17 genera)
