= Atewa Range Forest Reserve =

Mountain range in Ghana

Coordinates: 6°10′0″N 0°36′0″W

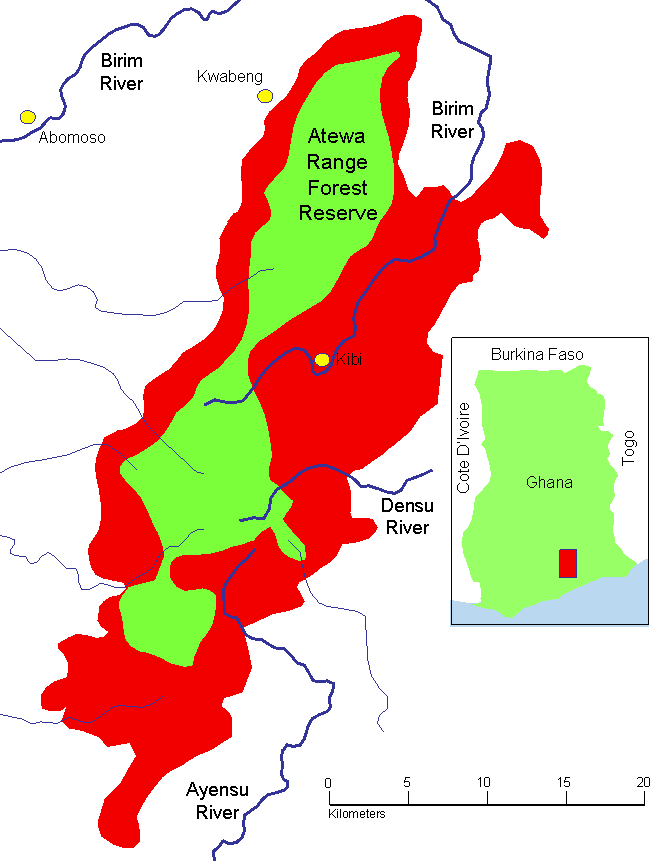
Atewa Range (dark red area) with Forest Reserve (lighter green area)

The Atewa Range Forest Reserve (also called the Atiwa-Atwaredu ranges) is in the Akyem Abuakwa region of southeastern Ghana, near the town of Kibi, and south-west of the Kwahu Plateau which forms the south-west boundary of Lake Volta. The range runs roughly north–south, consisting of steep-sided hills with fairly flat summits. It is the last remains of the Cenozoic peneplain that once covered southern Ghana, and contains ancient bauxitic soils. The range is the site of an important forest reserve, and the source of three major rivers.

== Forest Reserve ==
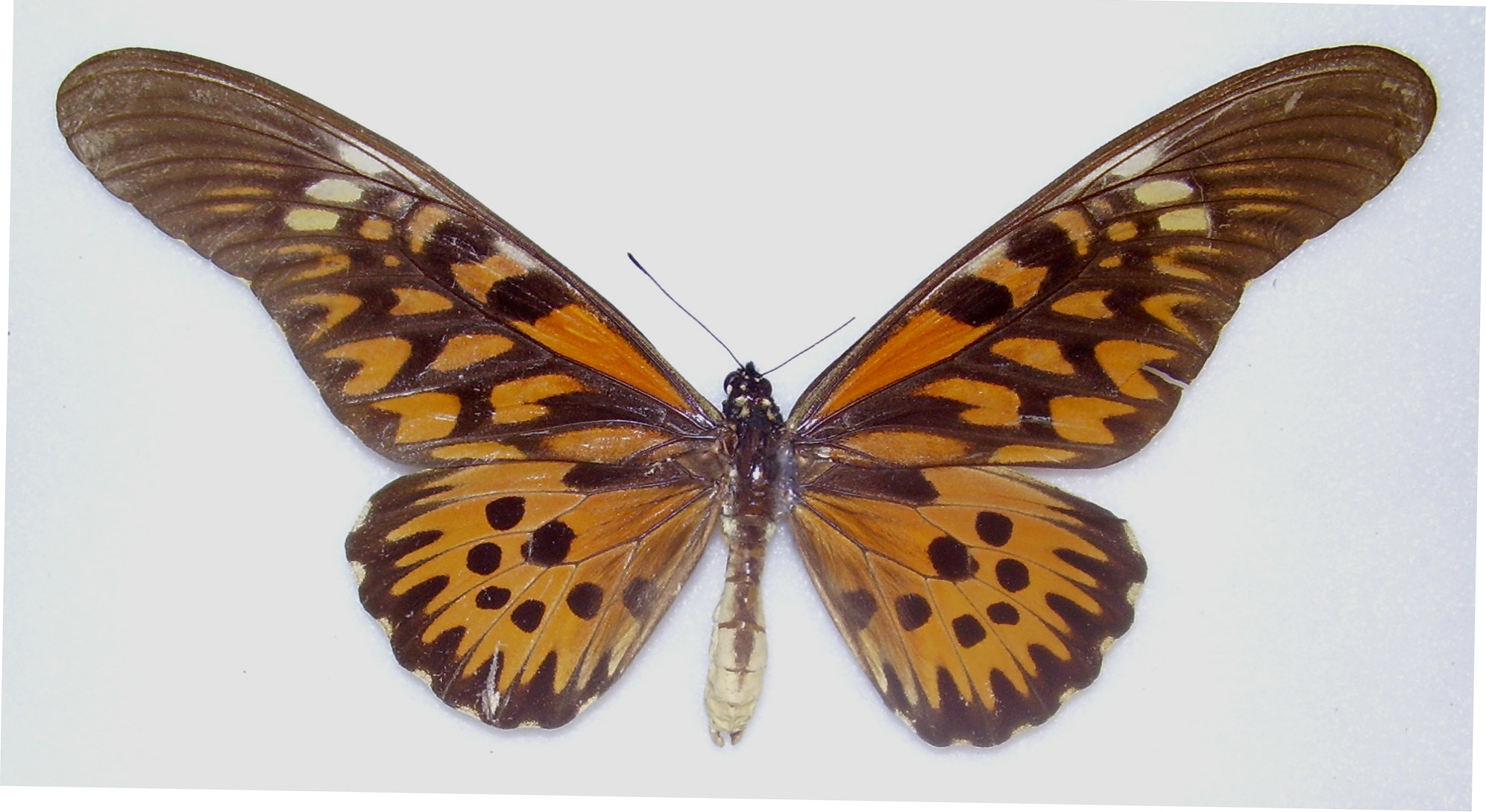
Giant African swallowtail (Papilio antimachus)

A large area of the range has been declared a forest reserve, including about 17,400 hectares of upland evergreen forest, rare for Ghana. The reserve is managed by the Forestry Commission of Ghana in collaboration with other stakeholders, key among them is the Okyeman Environment Foundation, which has restricted people from farming in the area and instead is trying to encourage eco-tourism. However, the reserve is under pressure from logging and hunting for bushmeat. It is also vulnerable to mining exploration activities, since the reserve contains gold deposits as well as low-grade bauxite.

Many of the plant species occur only in this part of Ghana, or in few other localities and part was declared as a specially protected GSBA (Globally Significant Biodiversity Area) following a national botanic survey of forest reserves by Ghana Forestry Dept. in the 1990s. The forest reserve contains many birds that are rare elsewhere in Ghana including Olive Long-tailed Cuckoo, Rufous-sided Broadbill, Least Honeyguide, Spotted Honeyguide, Common Bristlebill and Blue-headed Crested-Flycatcher. The reserve has been designated an Important Bird Area (IBA) by BirdLife International because it supports significant populations of many bird species.

== Discoveries ==
In a 2006 expedition to survey the reserve, scientists discovered two rare and possibly endangered species of primate in the reserve: ursine colobus and the olive colobus, as well as 17 rare butterfly species and the critically endangered frog species Conraua derooi. Butterfly species include Papilio antimachus, which has the widest wingspan in the world and Mylothris atewa, which may be globally critically endangered.

In May 2017, researchers from Rocha conducted a review of camera trap footage captured in Ghana's Atewa mountain range, they discovered the presence of white-naped mangabeys. The unexpected finding of these primates highlights the significance of camera trap technology in uncovering and documenting the biodiversity of the region.

In July 2021, a team of scientists including Dr Caleb Ofori-Boateng, a Ghanaian scientist from the CSIR-Forestry Research Institute of Ghana (CSIR-FORIG) discovered a critically endangered frog species, named Conraua sagyimase or the Atewa Slippery frog. These were found exclusively in the Atewa Range Forest Reserve, and it has been named after the community of Sagyimase, which has supported research on the frog. The Akan common name for the species translates to "the frog of the forest streams."

Again, October 2021, two British scientists conducting research in Ghana made an extraordinary rediscovery. They found Shelley's eagle-owl, a large and enigmatic owl species, in the Atewa Forest. Surprisingly, this bird had remained unnoticed by scientists in Ghana for nearly 150 years, adding to its elusive and mysterious nature.

== The call for national park ==
As early as 2012, a united front of prominent conservation organizations in Ghana formed the "Coalition of NGOs against mining in Atewa" (CONAMA). Acting in solidarity, they urgently appealed to the government of Ghana to prioritize the nation's heritage and the long-term well-being of its people by revoking all plans and decisions to convert the Atewa Range of Forest Reserves into a mining site. Furthermore, they called on the government to terminate any prospecting and mining contracts entered into with Vitmeco Ghana (Bauxite) Ltd, regardless of the associated costs.

The Okyenhene, Osagyefo Amoatia Ofori Panin and numerous non-governmental organizations and civil society organizations, including Rocha, are urging the government to recognize the immense benefits that would arise from converting the forest reserve into a national park instead of pursuing mining activities. They emphasize the significant positive impact such a transformation would have on the environment, biodiversity, and the country as a whole. By preserving the Atewa Forest Reserve as a national park, the government can safeguard its ecological value and ensure the sustainable conservation of its rich biodiversity for present and future generations.

== Resources ==
=== Rivers ===
The Atewa range is the source of three important rivers: the Ayensu and Densu Rivers which flow south into the Atlantic, and the Birim which makes a long detour north and southwest around the Atewa range before joining the Pra River. The Birim, which flows through all three of the traditional Akyem areas of Ghana, is an important but declining source of diamonds.

== Atewa Bauxite Mining ==
The Atewa Forest Reserve in Ghana is being considered as a potential location for an integrated bauxite-aluminum mine, facilitated by a Chinese resource-backed loan. This loan offers opportunities for infrastructure development across selected areas in the country.
