= De Witte's snout-burrower =

Conservation status
- Data Deficient (IUCN 3.1)

Scientific classification
- Kingdom: Animalia
- Phylum: Chordata
- Class: Amphibia
- Order: Anura
- Family: Hemisotidae
- Genus: Hemisus
- Species: H. wittei

Binomial name
- Hemisus wittei Laurent, 1963

Species of frog

De Witte's snout-burrower (Hemisus wittei) is a species of frog in the family Hemisotidae found in Democratic Republic of the Congo and Zambia. Its natural habitats are moist savanna, subtropical or tropical seasonally wet or flooded lowland grassland, intermittent freshwater marshes, and arable land.
