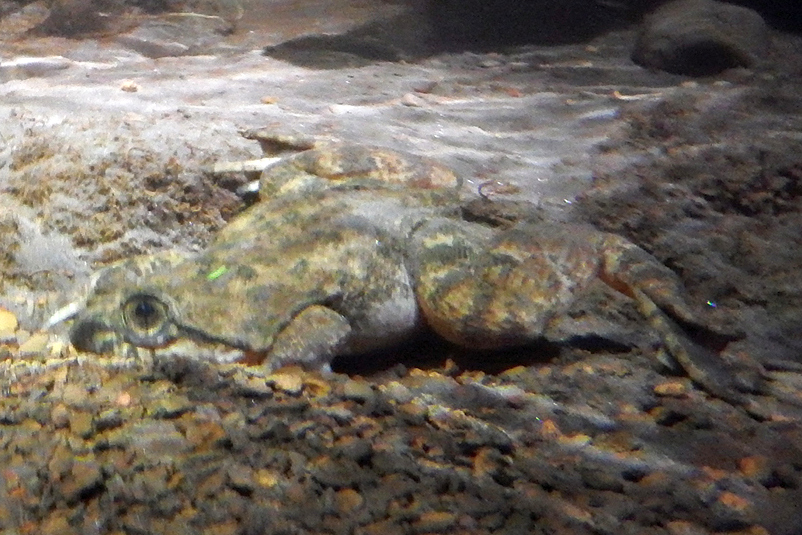

Conservation status
- Least Concern (IUCN 3.1)

Scientific classification
- Kingdom: Animalia
- Phylum: Chordata
- Class: Amphibia
- Order: Anura
- Family: Conrauidae
- Genus: Conraua
- Species: C. alleni

Binomial name
- Conraua alleni (Barbour & Loveridge, 1927)

= Conraua alleni =

Species of amphibian

Conraua alleni or Allen's slippery frog is a species of frog in the family Conrauidae found in the Ivory Coast, Guinea, Liberia, and Sierra Leone, along with a single outlying site in the Sui River Forest Reserve, Ghana. Its natural habitats are subtropical or tropical moist lowland forest, subtropical or tropical moist montane forest, and rivers.

It is an aquatic frog that is present in rainforest streams that flow both slowly and fast; the frogs are found in the relatively still areas of the streams.

It is threatened by habitat loss.

== See also ==
Genetic Relative: Goliath Frog
