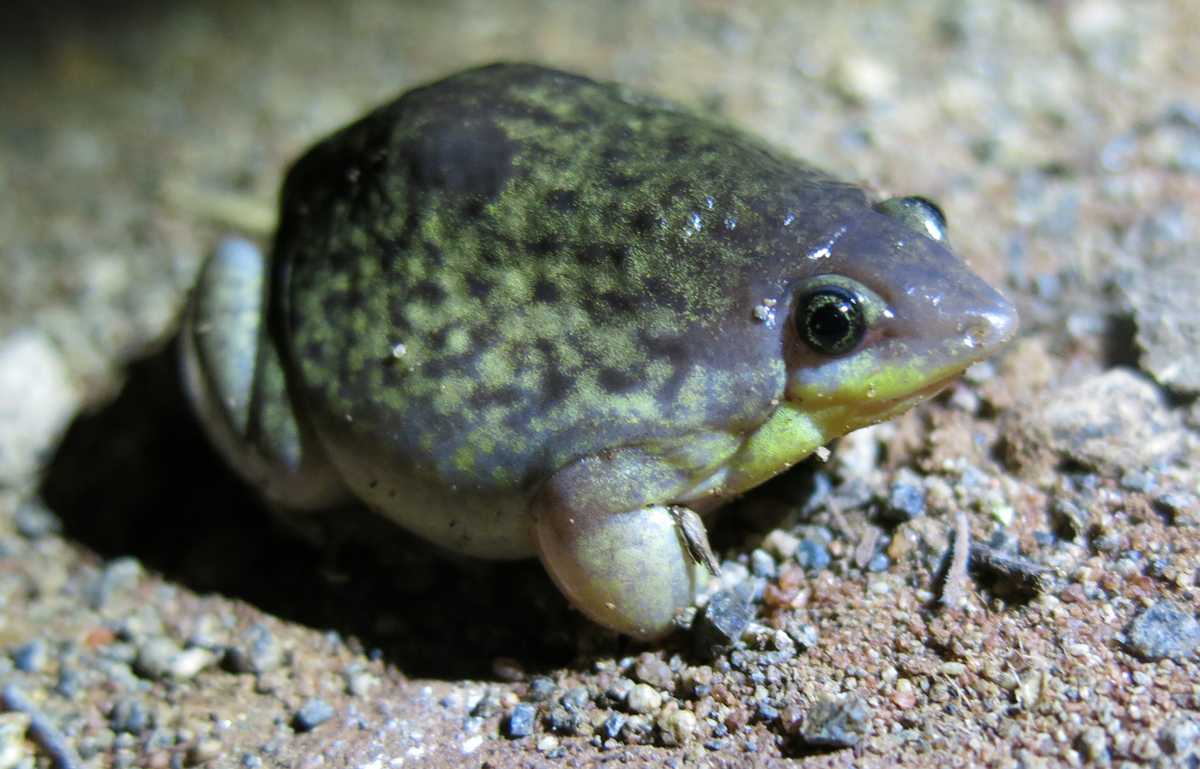
- H. marmoratus, Soutpansberg, South Africa

Conservation status
- Least Concern (IUCN 3.1)

Scientific classification
- Kingdom: Animalia
- Phylum: Chordata
- Class: Amphibia
- Order: Anura
- Family: Hemisotidae
- Genus: Hemisus
- Species: H. marmoratus

Binomial name
- Hemisus marmoratus (Peters, 1854)

Synonyms
- Hemisus sudanensis (Steindachner, 1863)

= Marbled snout-burrower =

Species of amphibian

The marbled snout-burrower (Hemisus marmoratus) is a species of frog in the family Hemisotidae. It is found in sub-Saharan Africa. Its natural habitats are subtropical or tropical dry forest, subtropical or tropical moist lowland forest, dry savanna, moist savanna, subtropical or tropical moist shrubland, subtropical or tropical high-altitude grassland, swamps, freshwater lakes, intermittent freshwater lakes, freshwater marshes, intermittent freshwater marshes, arable land, plantations, seasonally flooded agricultural land, and canals and ditches. It is also called the mottled shovelnose frog and marbled shovelnose frog.
