= Hemisus barotseensis =

Conservation status
- Data Deficient (IUCN 3.1)

Scientific classification
- Kingdom: Animalia
- Phylum: Chordata
- Class: Amphibia
- Order: Anura
- Family: Hemisotidae
- Genus: Hemisus
- Species: H. barotseensis

Binomial name
- Hemisus barotseensis Channing and Broadley, 2002

Species of amphibian

Hemisus barotseensis is a species of frogs in the family Hemisotidae. It is endemic to western Zambia and known with certainty only from the Barotse Floodplain, along the Zambezi River. The record from the Kafue Flats is uncertain.

== Description ==
Males measure 25–30 mm (0.98–1.18 in) and females 21–37 mm (0.83–1.46 in) in snout–vent length. The body is spherical with small head. The snout is tapered and has a hardened, pale tip. The arms short and muscular, with pointed fingers (the fore limbs are used in burrowing). The hind limbs are short. Skin is smooth. The dorsum and sides are translucent silvery-yellow on black background, with black mottling. Most specimens have a thin, pale vertebral stripe.

The male advertisement call is a long trill. Pulses come in quadruplets, with a pulse rate of 28 per second. The dominant frequency is 4.3 kHz. The call is unique among Hemisus.

== Habitat and conservation ==
Hemisus barotseensis lives in floodplains in savannas. It is probably fossorial, and nests in burrows in wet soil, adjacent to temporary water. Threats to it are unknown. It occurs in the Liuwa Plain and Lochinvar National Parks.
