= Olive snout-burrower =

Conservation status
- Least Concern (IUCN 3.1)

Scientific classification
- Kingdom: Animalia
- Phylum: Chordata
- Class: Amphibia
- Order: Anura
- Family: Hemisotidae
- Genus: Hemisus
- Species: H. olivaceus

Binomial name
- Hemisus olivaceus Laurent, 1963

Species of frog

The olive snout-burrower (Hemisus olivaceus), or olive shovelnose frog, is a species of frog in the family Hemisotidae, found in Democratic Republic of the Congo and possibly Uganda. Its natural habitats are subtropical or tropical moist lowland forests, swamps, freshwater marshes, and intermittent freshwater marshes. It is threatened by habitat loss.
