= Perret's snout-burrower =

Conservation status
- Least Concern (IUCN 3.1)

Scientific classification
- Kingdom: Animalia
- Phylum: Chordata
- Class: Amphibia
- Order: Anura
- Family: Hemisotidae
- Genus: Hemisus
- Species: H. perreti

Binomial name
- Hemisus perreti Laurent, 1972

Species of frog

Perret's snout-burrower (Hemisus perreti), also known as Perret's shovelnose frog, is a species of frog in the family Hemisotidae. It is found in Gabon, the Cabinda enclave of Angola, and western Democratic Republic of the Congo.

== Etymology ==
The specific name, perreti, honours Jean-Luc Perret, a Swiss herpetologist who has specialized in African amphibians.

== Habitat and conservation ==
The species inhabits pristine lowland rainforest, secondary forest, forest patches in savanna, and forest along the savanna-forest transition zone. It is probably a common species, but its secretive and fossorial habits make it easy to overlook. Threats to this little known species are unknown.
