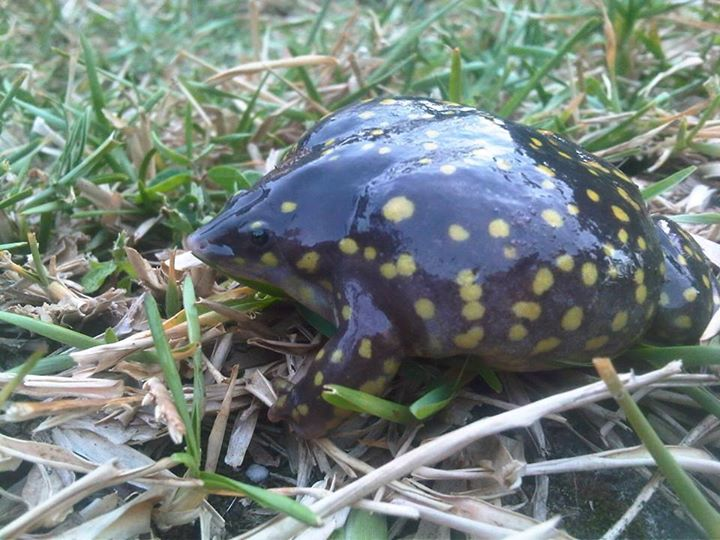

Conservation status
- Near Threatened (IUCN 3.1)

Scientific classification
- Kingdom: Animalia
- Phylum: Chordata
- Class: Amphibia
- Order: Anura
- Family: Hemisotidae
- Genus: Hemisus
- Species: H. guttatus

Binomial name
- Hemisus guttatus (Rapp, 1842)

= Spotted snout-burrower =

Species of frog

The spotted snout-burrower (Hemisus guttatus), or spotted shovelnose frog, is a species of frog in the family Hemisotidae, found in South Africa and possibly Eswatini.

Its natural habitats are dry savanna, moist savanna, temperate shrubland, temperate grassland, rivers, intermittent rivers, swamps, intermittent freshwater lakes, intermittent freshwater marshes, and canals and ditches. It is threatened by habitat loss.
