= Ethiopian snout-burrower =

Conservation status
- Least Concern (IUCN 3.1)

Scientific classification
- Kingdom: Animalia
- Phylum: Chordata
- Class: Amphibia
- Order: Anura
- Family: Hemisotidae
- Genus: Hemisus
- Species: H. microscaphus

Binomial name
- Hemisus microscaphus Laurent, 1972

Species of frog

The Ethiopian snout-burrower (Hemisus microscaphus), also known as the Lake Zwai snout-burrower or Lake Zwai shovelnose frog, is a species of frog in the family Hemisotidae, endemic to Ethiopia.

Its natural habitats are subtropical or tropical dry forests, dry savanna, subtropical or tropical high-altitude grassland, rivers, swamps, intermittent freshwater marshes, freshwater springs, and heavily degraded former forests. It is threatened by habitat loss.
