= Masiliwa snout-burrower =

Conservation status
- Near Threatened (IUCN 3.1)

Scientific classification
- Kingdom: Animalia
- Phylum: Chordata
- Class: Amphibia
- Order: Anura
- Family: Hemisotidae
- Genus: Hemisus
- Species: H. brachydactylus

Binomial name
- Hemisus brachydactylus Laurent, 1963

Species of amphibian

The Masiliwa snout-burrower (Hemisus brachydactylus), or Masiliwa shovelnose frog, is a species of frog in the family Hemisotidae. It is endemic to Tanzania.

Its natural habitats are dry savanna, moist savanna, and intermittent freshwater marshes.
