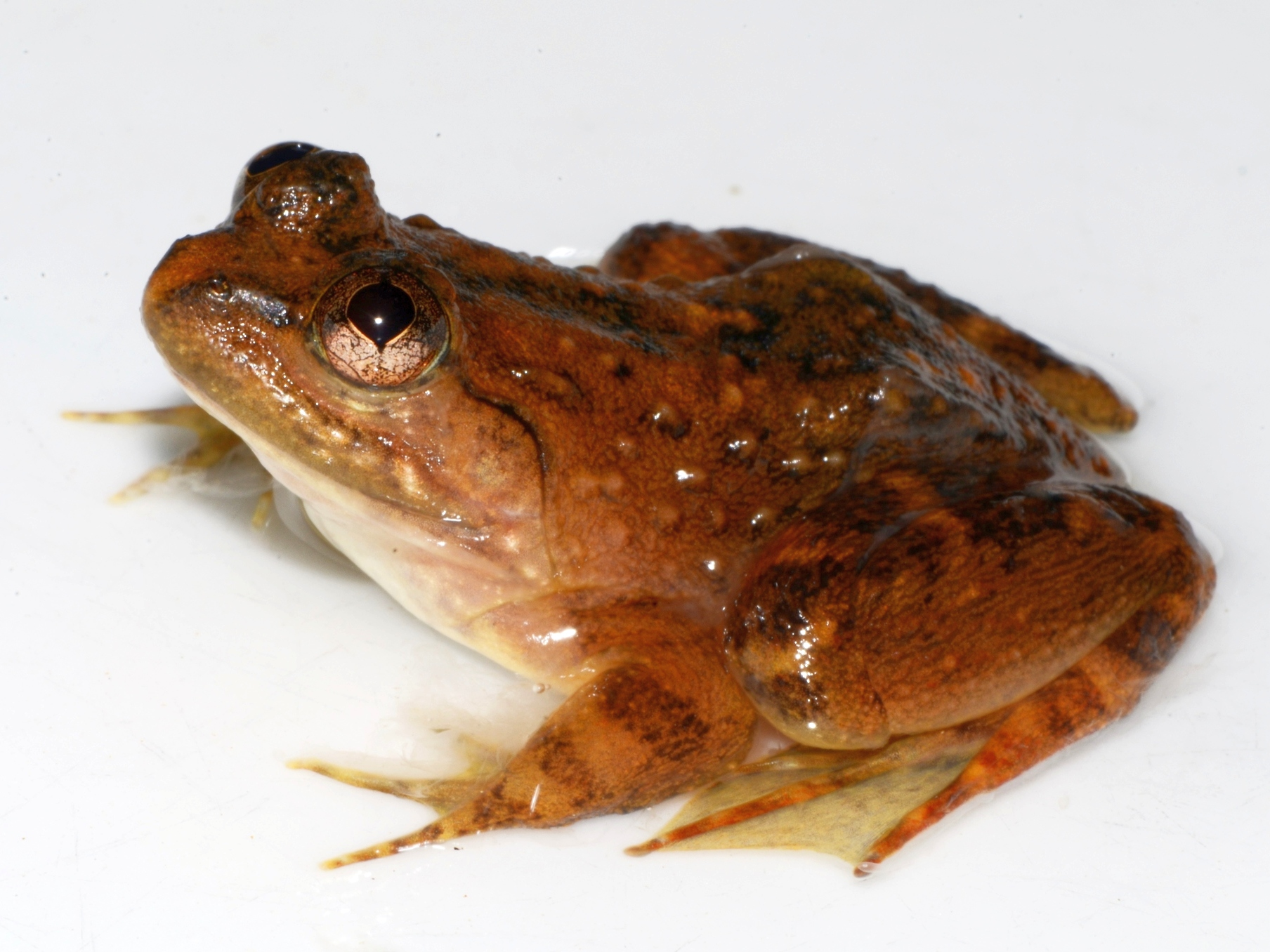

Conservation status
- Least Concern (IUCN 3.1)

Scientific classification
- Kingdom: Animalia
- Phylum: Chordata
- Class: Amphibia
- Order: Anura
- Family: Conrauidae
- Genus: Conraua
- Species: C. crassipes

Binomial name
- Conraua crassipes (Buchholz and Peters, 1875)

Synonyms
- Rana crassipes Buchholz and Peters in Peters, 1875; Rana perpalmata De Witte, 1922

= Conraua crassipes =

Species of frog

Conraua crassipes is a species of frog in the family Conrauidae. It is found in eastern Nigeria, Cameroon, Equatorial Guinea (including the island of Bioko), Gabon, the Republic of the Congo, and the Democratic Republic of the Congo. Presumably it also occurs in the southwestern Central African Republic and in the Cabinda Enclave of Angola. Common name Abo slippery frog has been coined for it.

Conraua crassipes is a common species living in or near fast-flowing, clear-water rivers and streams in low altitude rainforest, possibly to elevations up to about 1,000 m (3,300 ft) above sea level. It tolerates some habitat degradation, provided that trees remain and the habitat does not become too open. It is adversely affected by the loss of its forest habitat for agriculture, logging and human settlements, and sedimentation of its breeding streams. It occurs in several protected areas.

== See also ==
Genetic Relative: Goliath frog
