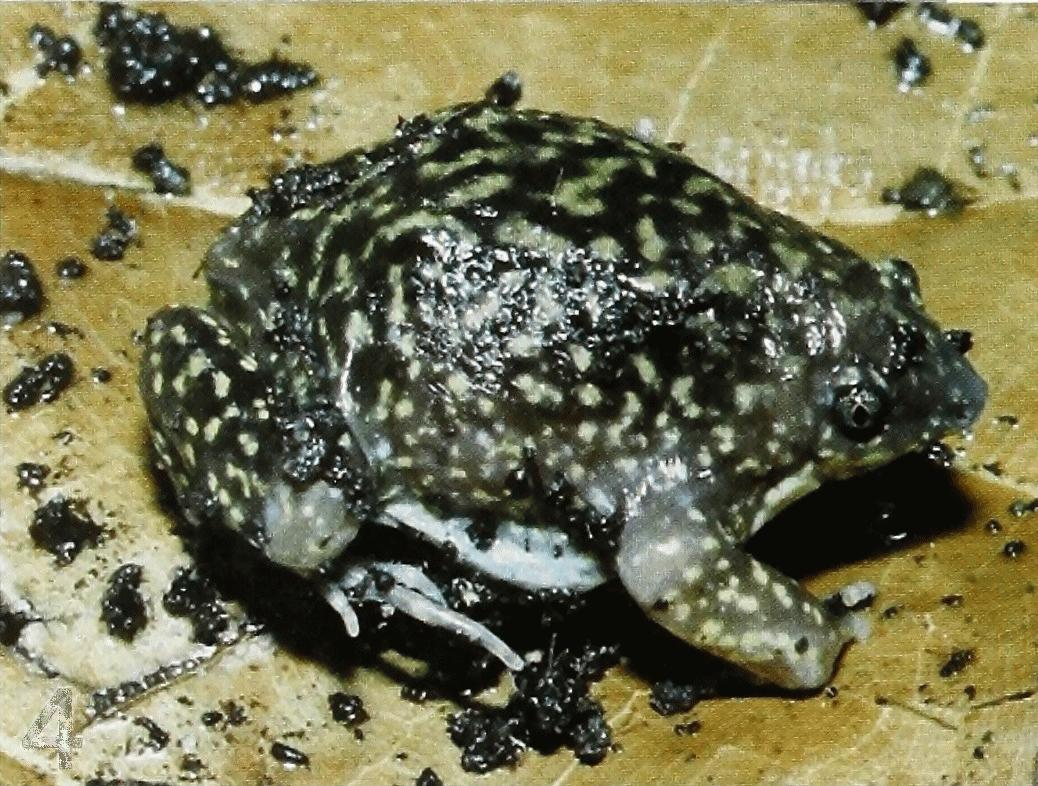

Conservation status
- Least Concern (IUCN 3.1)

Scientific classification
- Kingdom: Animalia
- Phylum: Chordata
- Class: Amphibia
- Order: Anura
- Family: Hemisotidae
- Genus: Hemisus
- Species: H. guineensis

Binomial name
- Hemisus guineensis Cope, 1865

= Guinea snout-burrower =

Species of frog

The Guinea snout-burrower (Hemisus guineensis), or Guinea shovelnose frog, is a species of frog in the family Hemisotidae found in sub-Saharan Africa. Its natural habitats are subtropical or tropical moist lowland forests, dry savanna, moist savanna, subtropical or tropical dry shrubland, subtropical or tropical dry lowland grassland, intermittent freshwater marshes, heavily degraded former forests, ponds, and canals and ditches.
