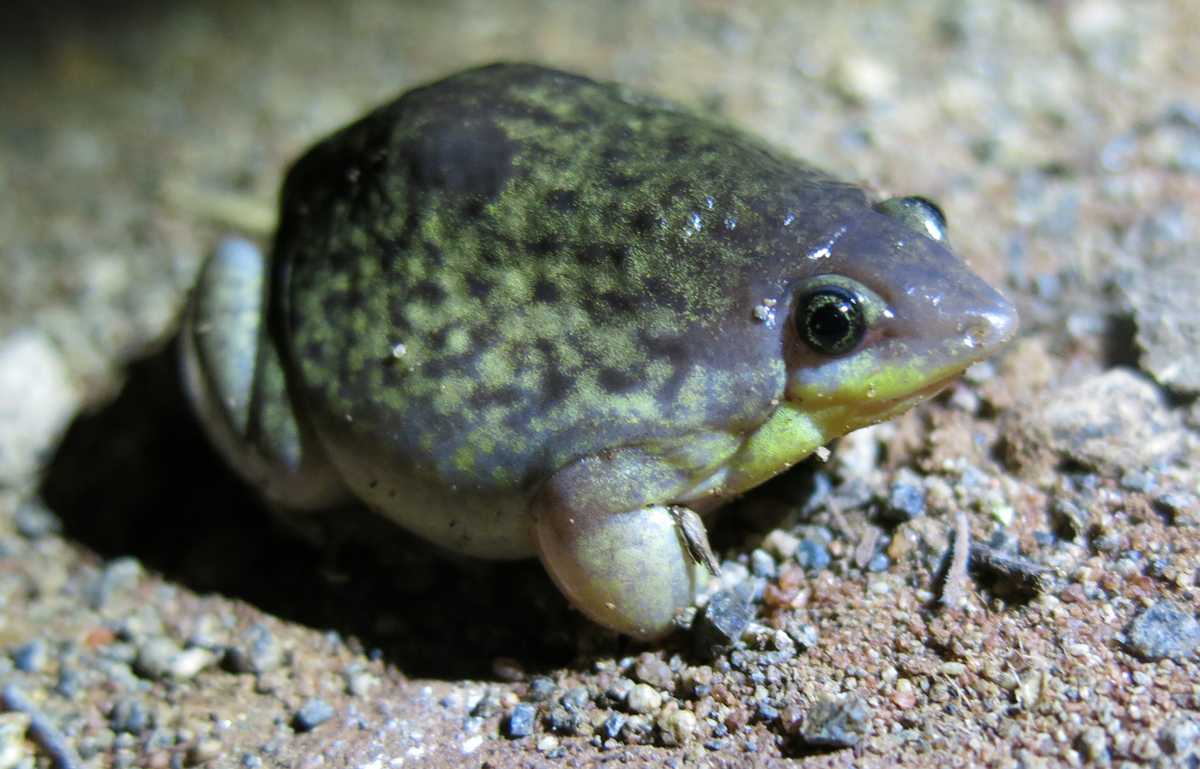
- Marbled snout-burrower

Scientific classification
- Kingdom: Animalia
- Phylum: Chordata
- Class: Amphibia
- Order: Anura
- Clade: Afrobatrachia
- Family: Hemisotidae; Cope, 1867
- Genus: Hemisus; Günther, 1859

Species
- Hemisus barotseensis Hemisus brachydactylus Hemisus guineensis Hemisus guttatus Hemisus marmoratus Hemisus microscaphus Hemisus olivaceus Hemisus perreti Hemisus wittei
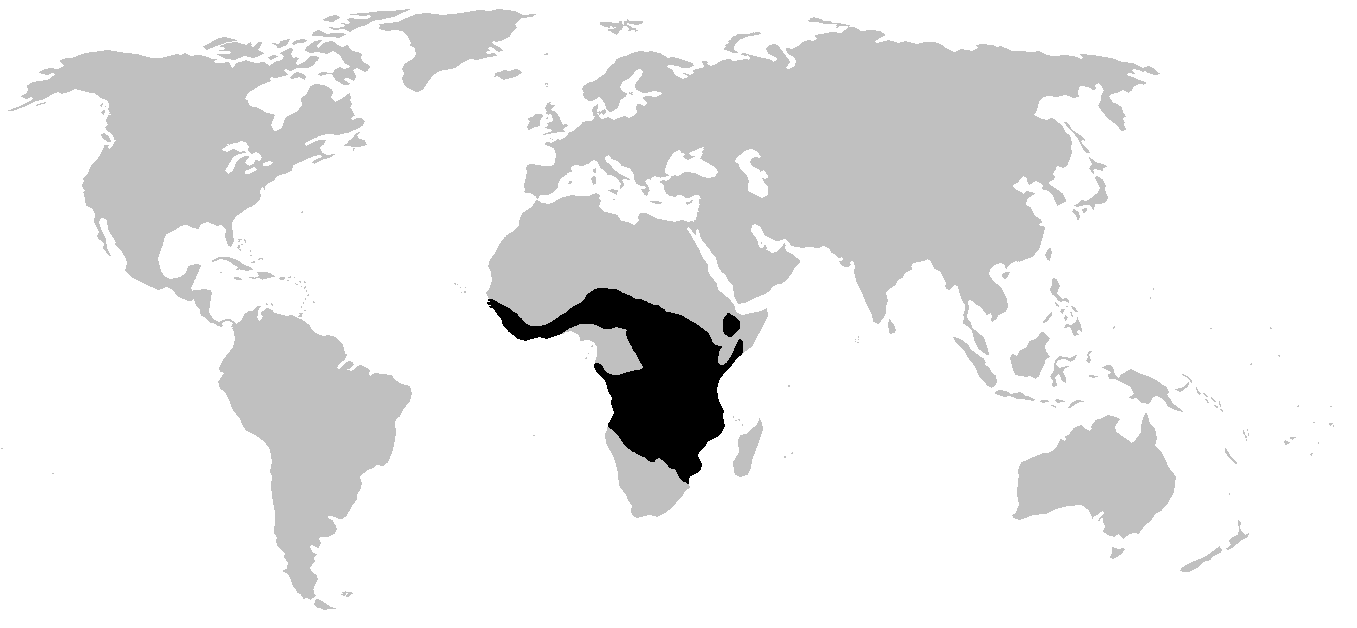
- Distribution of Hemisotidae (in black)

= Shovelnose frog =

Shovelnose frogs

Genus of amphibians

The shovelnose frogs are the species of frogs in the genus, Hemisus, the only genus in the family Hemisotidae. They are found in tropical and subtropical sub-Saharan Africa. The shovelnose frogs are moderate-sized frogs, reaching a length of 8 cm (3.1 in). They are round-bodied, with short legs. Their heads are small and narrow, with hard, upturned noses.

The shovelnose frogs are burrowing frogs, living most of their lives underground. The female digs underground while in amplexus, and lays her eggs in an underground cavity. The male leaves through the tunnel, and the female remains with the eggs. Once sufficient rain has fallen, the female burrows with her nose towards a water source, where the tadpoles will remain until metamorphosis. The tadpoles may remain out of water up to a few days.

Unlike most burrowing frogs, the shovelnose frogs burrow head-first, as opposed to rear-first, hence their other common names - snout-burrowers. Some species are kept as pets.

== Species ==
Family Hemisotidae

- Genus Hemisus
  - H. barotseensis - Mongu shovelnose frog (Channing & Broadley, 2002)
  - H. brachydactylus - Masiliwa snout-burrower or Masiliwa shovelnose frog (Laurent, 1963)
  - H. guineensis - Guinea snout-burrower or Guinea shovelnose frog (Cope, 1865)
  - H. guttatus - spotted snout-burrower or spotted shovelnose frog (Rapp, 1842)
  - H. marmoratus - marbled snout-burrower, mottled shovelnose frog, or marbled shovelnose frog (Steindachner, 1863)
  - H. microscaphus - Ethiopian snout-burrower, Lake Zwai snout-burrower or Lake Zwai shovelnose frog (Laurent, 1972)
  - H. olivaceus - olive snout-burrower or olive shovelnose frog (Laurent, 1963)
  - H. perreti - Perret's shovelnose frog (Laurent, 1972)
  - H. wittei - De Witte's snout-burrower or Witte's shovelnose frog (Laurent, 1963)
