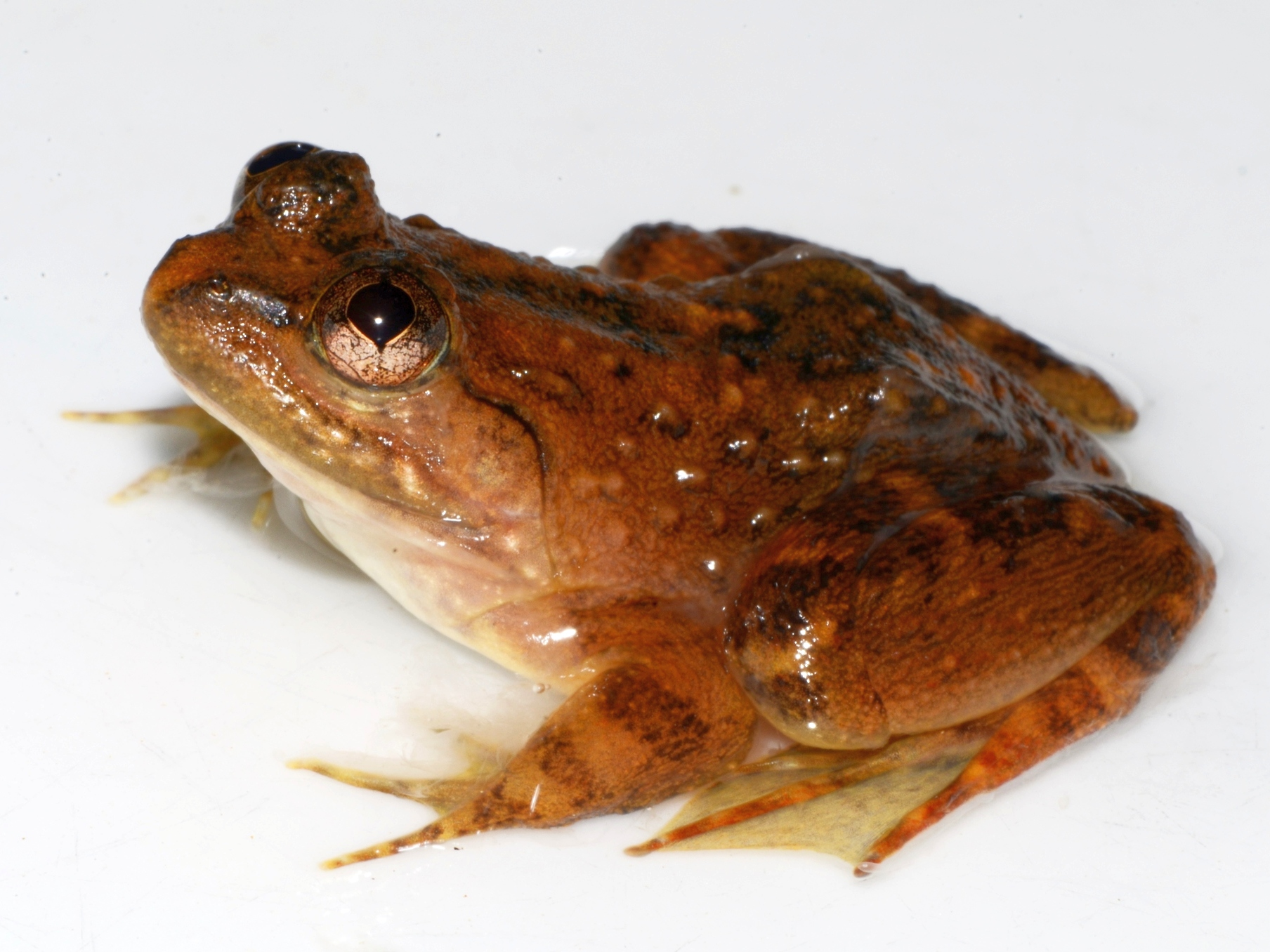
- Conraua crassipes

Scientific classification
- Kingdom: Animalia
- Phylum: Chordata
- Class: Amphibia
- Order: Anura
- Superfamily: Ranoidea
- Family: Conrauidae; Dubois, 1992
- Genus: Conraua; Nieden, 1908

Type species
- Conraua robusta Nieden, 1908

= Conraua =

Genus of amphibians

Conraua, known as slippery frogs or giant frogs is a genus of large frogs from sub-Saharan Africa. Conraua is the only genus in the family Conrauidae. Alternatively, it may be placed in the family Petropedetidae.

This genus includes the largest frog of the world, Conraua goliath, which may grow to 32 cm (13 in) in snout–vent length and weigh as much as 3.3 kg (7.3 lb). Four of the seven species in this genus are threatened.

== Etymology ==
The generic name Conraua honours Gustav Conrau, a German trader and labour recruiter in Cameroon who was the collector of the holotype of Conraua robusta, the type species of the genus.

== Species ==
The recognized species are:

- Conraua alleni (Barbour & Loveridge, 1927)
- Conraua beccarii (Boulenger, 1911)
- Conraua crassipes (Buchholz & W. Peters in W. Peters, 1875)
- Conraua derooi Hulselmans, 1972
- Conraua goliath (Boulenger, 1906) – goliath frog
- Conraua robusta Nieden, 1908 – Cameroon slippery frog
- Conraua sagyimase Neira-Salamea, Ofori-Boateng, Kouamé, Blackburn, Segniagbeto, Hillers, Barej, Leaché & Rödel, 2021
- Conraua kamancamarai Neira-Salamea, Doumbia, Hillers, Sandberger-Loua, Kouamé, Brede, Schäfer, Blackburn, Barej & Rödel, 2022

Nota bene: A binomial authority in parentheses indicates that the species was originally described in a genus other than Conraua.
