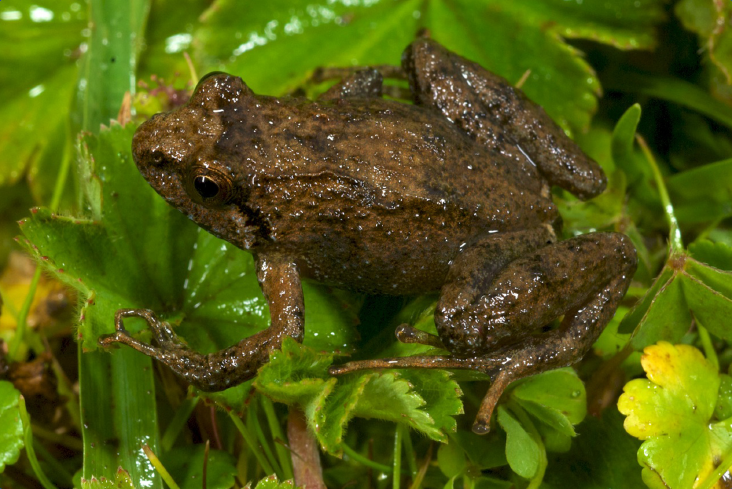

Conservation status
- Critically Endangered (IUCN 3.1)

Scientific classification
- Kingdom: Animalia
- Phylum: Chordata
- Class: Amphibia
- Order: Anura
- Family: Ericabatrachidae; Dubois, Ohler, and Pyron, 2021
- Genus: Ericabatrachus; Largen, 1991
- Species: E. baleensis

Binomial name
- Ericabatrachus baleensis Largen, 1991

= Ericabatrachus =

Genus of amphibians

Ericabatrachus is a genus of frogs in the family Ericabatrachidae endemic to the Bale Mountains in Ethiopia. It is monotypic, being represented by the single species Ericabatrachus baleensis, commonly known as the Bale Mountains frog. It was previously included in the family Petropedetidae, but is now placed in its own monotypic family, Ericabatrachidae.

== Taxonomy ==
Ericabatrachus baleensis is monotypic within its genus and family. The phylogenetic relationships of this poorly known species have been debated, but molecular analyses has placed it the family Petropedetidae, instead of Phrynobatrachidae or Pyxicephalidae, where it has also been placed. It was updated again in 2021, placing it in the family Ericabatrachidae.

== Description ==
Bale Mountains frogs are small; adult males measure 19–22 mm (0.75–0.87 in) in snout–vent length and females 23–27 mm (0.91–1.06 in). Their fingers are not webbed and toes have rudimentary webbing. Adult males have well-defined femoral glands.

== Habitat and conservation ==
Its natural habitats are grassy banks of small, fast-flowing streams in giant heath woodland and adjoining Astropanax–Hagenia forest. It is critically endangered because its range is extremely small and the habitat is under threat from trampling of streams, deforestation, and settlement development, despite being located in the Bale Mountains National Park.
