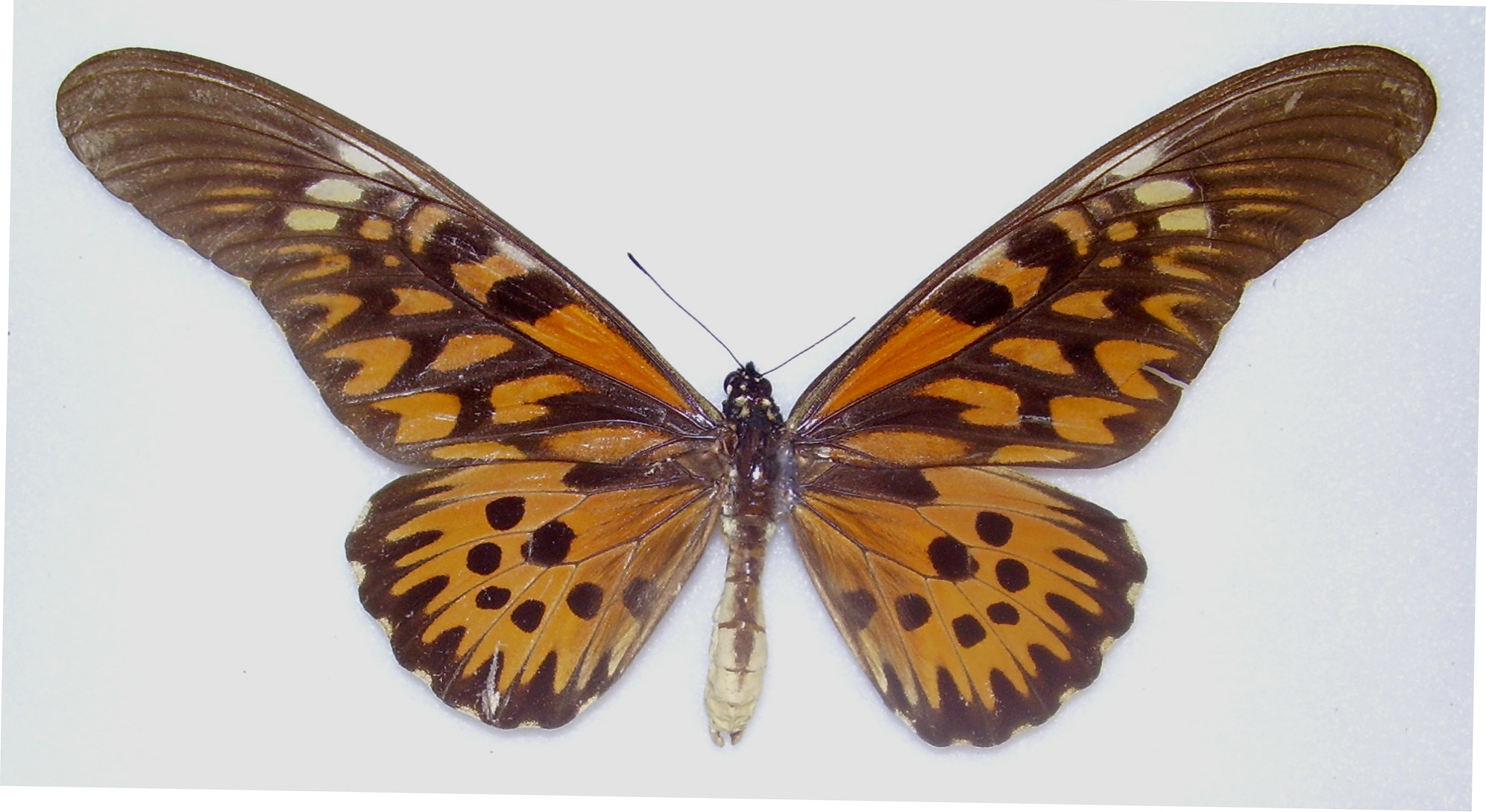
- Male, upperside

Conservation status
- Data Deficient (IUCN 3.1)

Scientific classification
- Kingdom: Animalia
- Phylum: Arthropoda
- Clade: Pancrustacea
- Class: Insecta
- Order: Lepidoptera
- Family: Papilionidae
- Genus: Papilio
- Species: P. antimachus

Binomial name
- Papilio antimachus Drury, 1782

Synonyms
- Drurya antimachus var. gigantea Watkins, 1899; Drurya antimachus ab. plagiata Stichel, 1903; Papilio antimachus f. parvus Reuss, 1922; Papilio antimachus f. karschi Reuss, 1922; Papilio antimachus f. rothschildiana Reuss, 1922; Papilio antimachus f. staudingeri Reuss, 1922; Papilio antimachus f. centrispila Le Cerf, 1924; Papilio antimachus f. melanescens Le Cerf, 1924; Papilio antimachus congolanus Dufrane, 1929; Papilio antimachus congolanus ab. vreuricki Dufrane, 1929; Papilio antimachus congolanus ab. pupillata Dufrane, 1929; Papilio antimachus congolanus ab. obsoleta Dufrane, 1929; Papilio antimachus congolanus ab. lagai Dufrane, 1929; Papilio antimachus congolanus ab. virgularia Dufrane, 1929; Papilio antimachus coffea Talbot, 1936; Papilio antimachus congolanus ab. burgeoni Dufrane, 1946

= Papilio antimachus =

African giant swallowtail

Species of butterfly

Papilio antimachus, the African giant swallowtail, is a butterfly in the family Papilionidae. With a wingspan between 18 and 23 centimetres (7.1 and 9.1 in), it is the largest butterfly in Africa and among the largest butterflies in the world. The shape of the wings differ between the males and females.

The wings are long and narrow and the ground colour is orange brown with black markings. P. antimachus live in the tropical rainforests of west and central Africa. The distribution area (range) stretches from Angola, Cameroon, Democratic Republic of the Congo, Republic of the Congo, Gabon, Ghana, Ivory Coast, Liberia, Nigeria, Sierra Leone, and Uganda. It is much rarer in the west of its range (Guinea to Cameroon) than in the eastern parts of its range. It probably stays in forest canopy but males come down to mud-puddle. The male is larger than the female and can be seen in groups at nectar. The females show themselves less, continually flying high above the treetops. It has been seen hill-topping in Liberia. The butterfly may have no natural enemies because it is very toxic and advertises it with a resemblance of other similar butterflies including the much smaller Acraea. The larval foodplant is unknown and nothing is published on the early stages (egg, larva, pupa). Cardiac glycosides found in the Imago by Miriam Rothschild indicate that the so-far unidentified larva, most probably, sequesters foodplant toxins which persist through pupation into the imago as an aposematic protection against predation, and therefore that the larval foodplant is probably an asclepiad vine.

The type specimen was probably collected by Henry Smeathman from whose collections it was described by Dru Drury. The specimens were later bought by Alexander Macleay (1767–1848).

Torben Larsen developed a species numbering system for his 2005 publication Butterflies of West Africa. This species is #1. The 'Larsen' numbers have since been used with permission in A Sharp Eye on Butterflies of Ghana.

== Subspecies ==
- Papilio antimachus antimachus — Guinea, Sierra Leone, Liberia, Ivory Coast, Ghana, Togo, southern Nigeria, Cameroon, Gabon, Congo, Central African Republic, western Democratic Republic of the Congo, southern Sudan, northern Angola
- Papilio antimachus parva Jackson, 1956 — eastern Democratic Republic of the Congo, Uganda
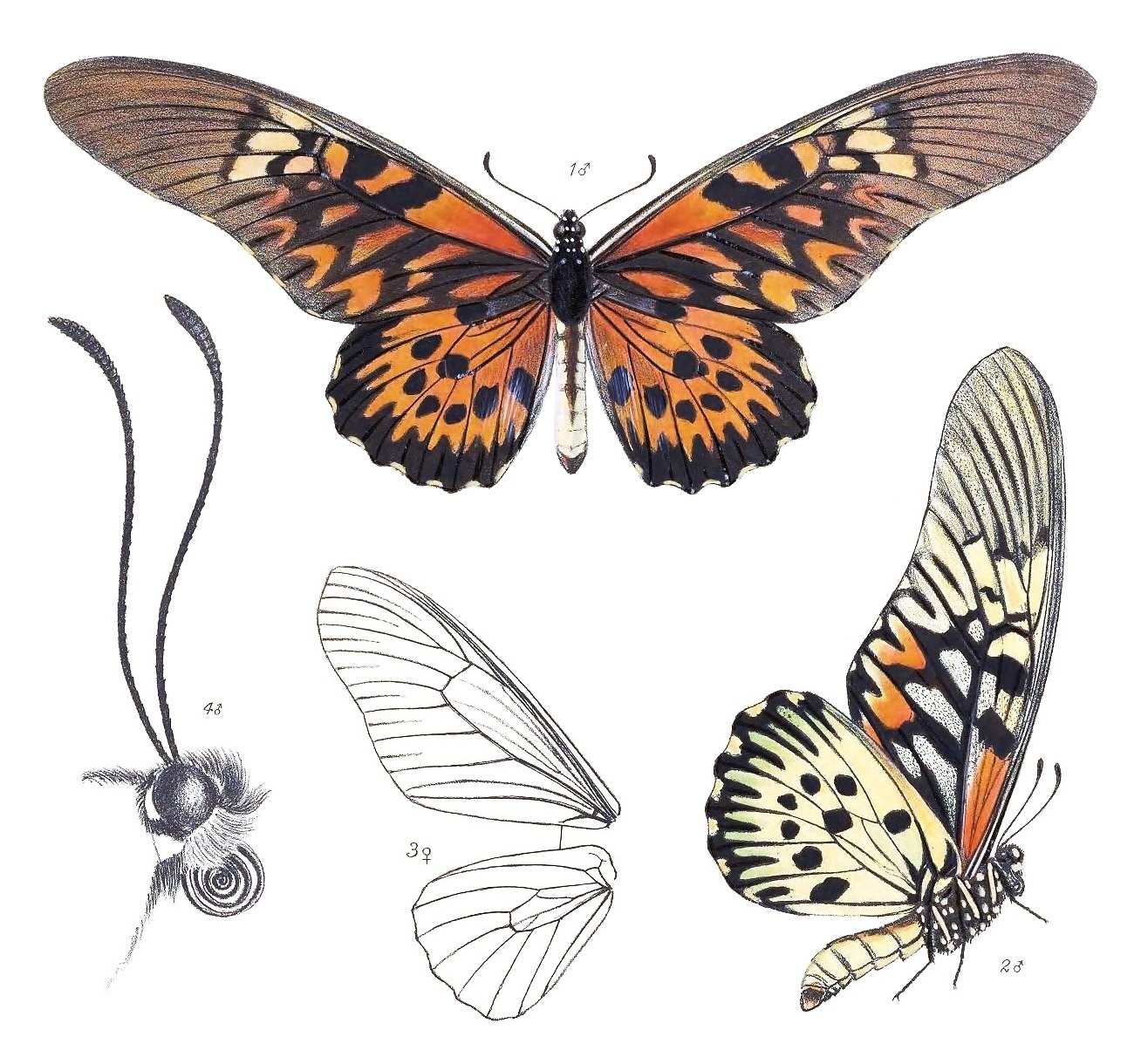
1. dorsal view of male imago
2. lateral view of male imago
3. wing venation of female
4. magnified head of male
Illustrated by Rippon (1894)

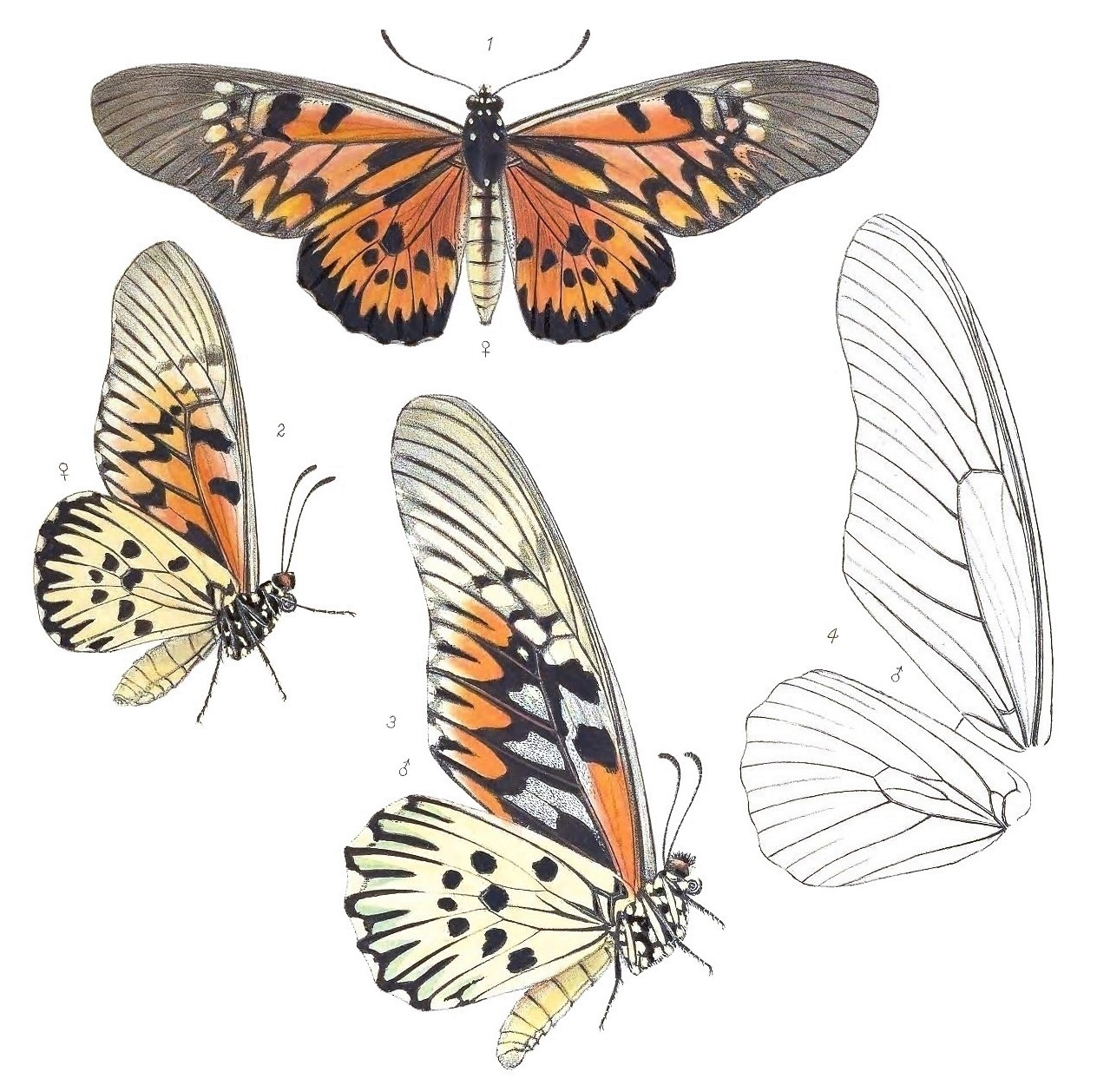
1. dorsal view of female imago
2. lateral view of female imago
3. lateral view of male imago
4. wing venation of male
Illustrated by Rippon (1894)
