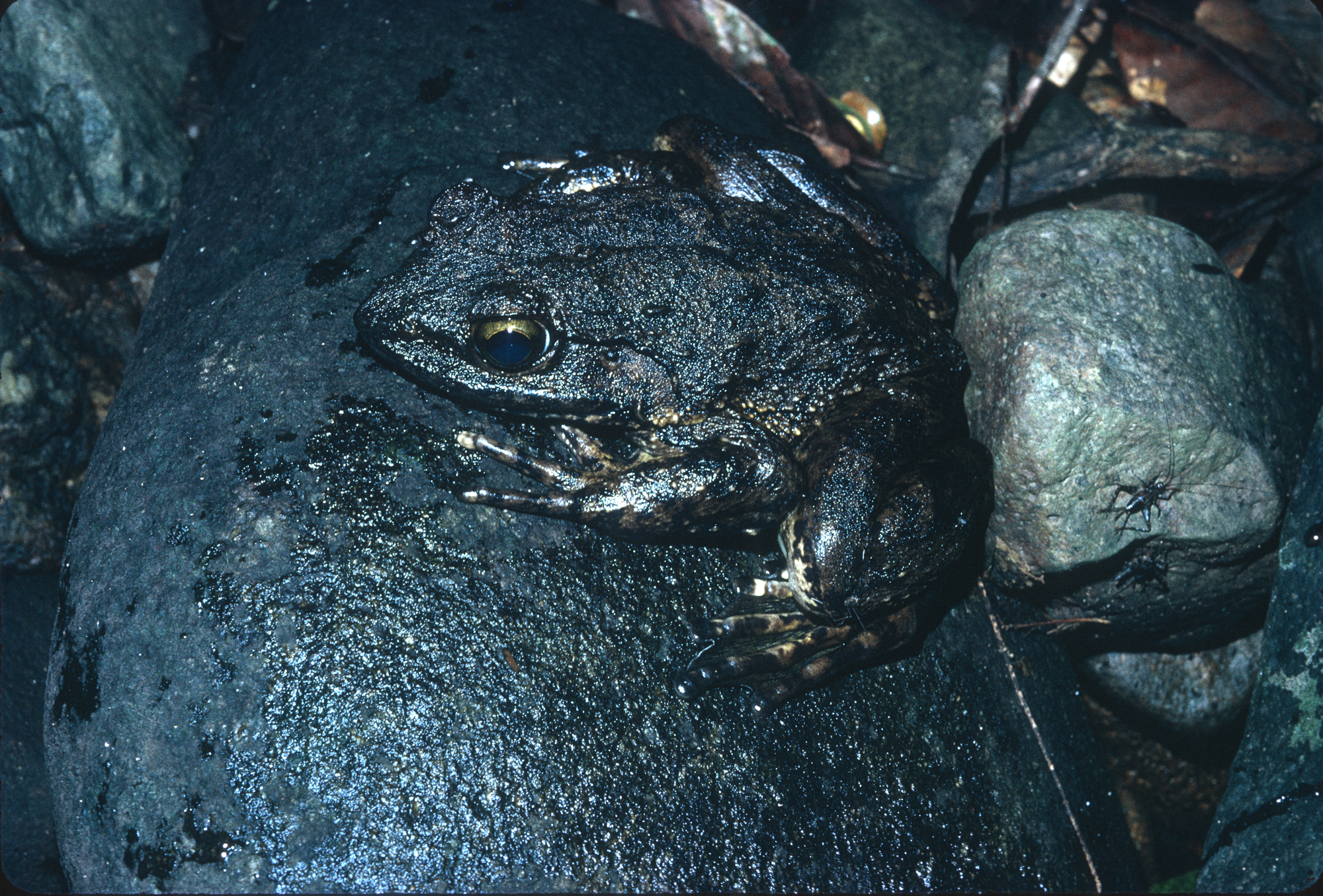

Conservation status
- Endangered (IUCN 3.1)

Scientific classification
- Kingdom: Animalia
- Phylum: Chordata
- Class: Amphibia
- Order: Anura
- Family: Conrauidae
- Genus: Conraua
- Species: C. goliath

Binomial name
- Conraua goliath (Boulenger, 1906)
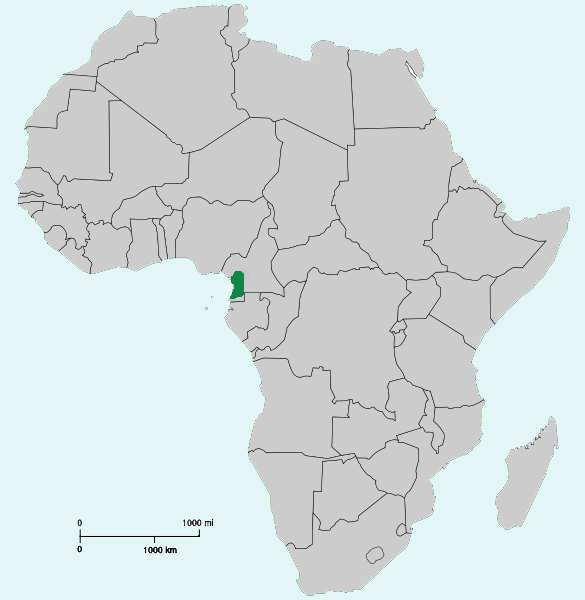

Synonyms
- Rana goliath Boulenger, 1906; Gigantorana goliath — Noble, 1931; Paleorana goliath — Scortecci, 1931; Rana (Conraua) goliath — Parker, 1936; Conraua goliath — Lamotte, Perret & Dzieduszycka, 1959

= Goliath frog =

Species of amphibian

The goliath frog (Conraua goliath), otherwise known commonly as the giant slippery frog and the goliath bullfrog, is a species of frog in the family Conrauidae. The goliath frog is the largest living frog. Specimens can reach up to about 45 centimetres (18 in) in snout–vent length and 4.5 kilograms (9.9 lb) in weight. This species has a relatively small habitat range in Cameroon and Equatorial Guinea. Its numbers are dwindling due to habitat destruction, collection for food, and the pet trade.

== Description ==
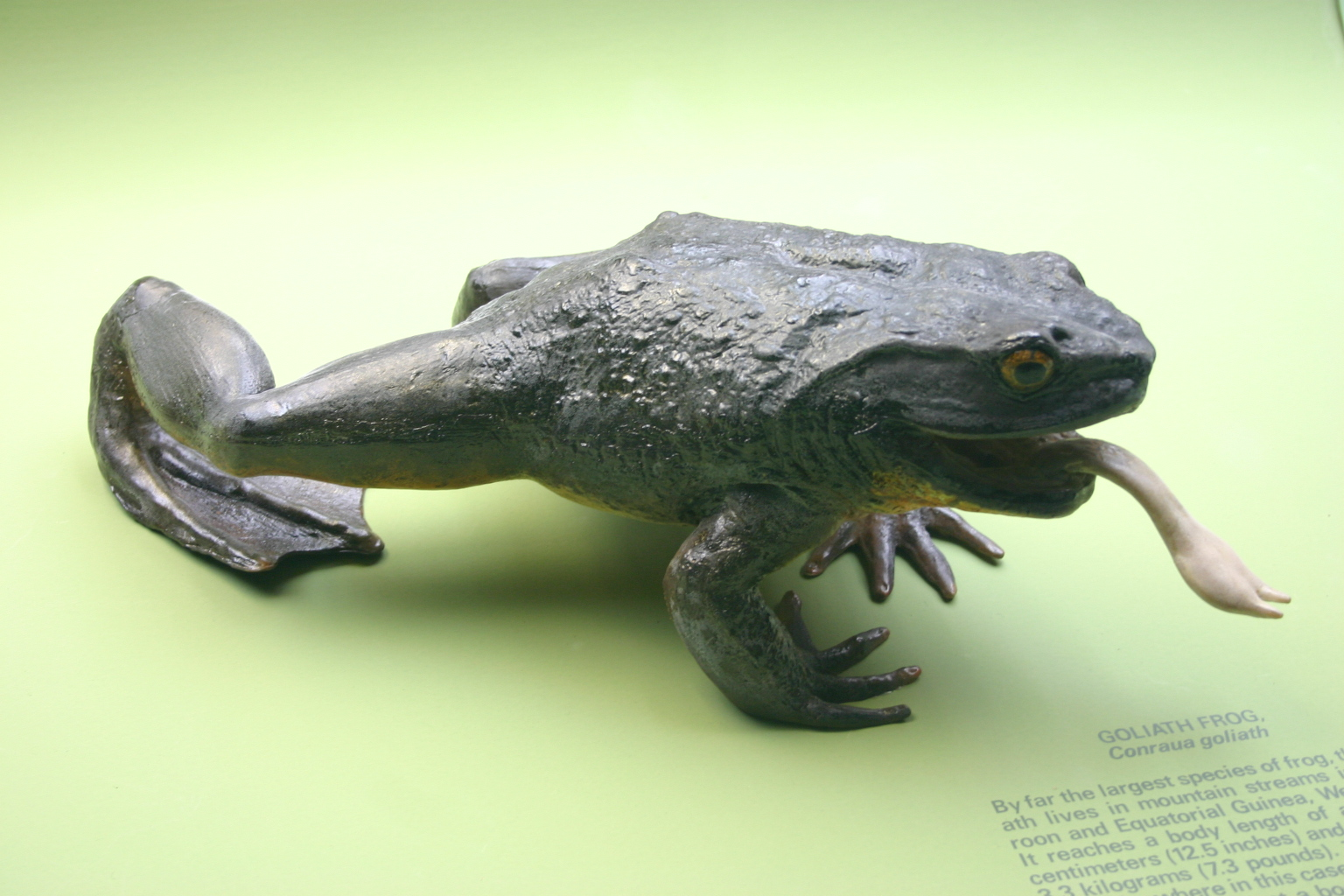
Model at the American Museum of Natural History

The male and female are very similar. In a sample of 15 individuals, weights ranged between 600 and 3,250 g (1.3 and 7.2 lb), and snout–vent lengths were between 17 and 32 cm (6.7 and 12.6 in). In total length, including outstretched legs, the largest specimens can slightly exceed 80 cm (31 in). The heaviest verified specimen, caught in the Muni River system in 1960, weighed 3,305 g (7.3 lb) and had a snout–vent length of 34.0 cm (13.4 in). The longest verified specimen, caught in the same river system in 1966, weighed 3,100 g (6.8 lb) and had a snout–vent length of 35.6 cm (14.0 in). There are unverified claims of considerably larger specimens, but they are dubious. Their eyes can be nearly 2.5 cm (1.0 in) in diameter. The conspicuous tympanum has a diameter around 0.5 cm (0.20 in) and is separated from the eye by about 5 cm (2.0 in) in adults. Goliath frog eggs and tadpoles are about the same size as other frogs despite their very large adult form.

A lateral fold extends from the eye to the posterior portion of the tympanum. Their toes are fully webbed, with large interdigital membranes extending down to the toe tips. The second toe is the longest. The skin on the dorsum and on top of the limbs is granular. Dorsal coloration is green sienna, while the abdomen and ventral part of the limbs are yellow/orange. They have acute hearing, but no vocal sac, and also lack nuptial pads.

== Habitat and distribution ==
The goliath frog is mainly found near waterfalls in Equatorial Guinea and Cameroon. Their habitat is divided into two main seasons: the dry season which occurs from November to April and the rainy season which occurs from May to October.

Due to its large size, the goliath frog has an extremely selective distribution. This species is primarily located in a dense equatorial forest fringe which is somewhat parallel to the coast and surrounded by rivers. The goliath frog has been located in Sanaga Basin (mainly appearing near the Nachtigal cascades and in the Sakbayeme rapids), Kienke Basin, Ntem Basin (mainly being located near the rapids of the Mensolo and Nsana), and Mbía Basin (where it was found to be very abundant in the rapids and cascades). These distribution patterns emphasize its limited environment which tends to have a clear preference for water territories.

== Conservation ==
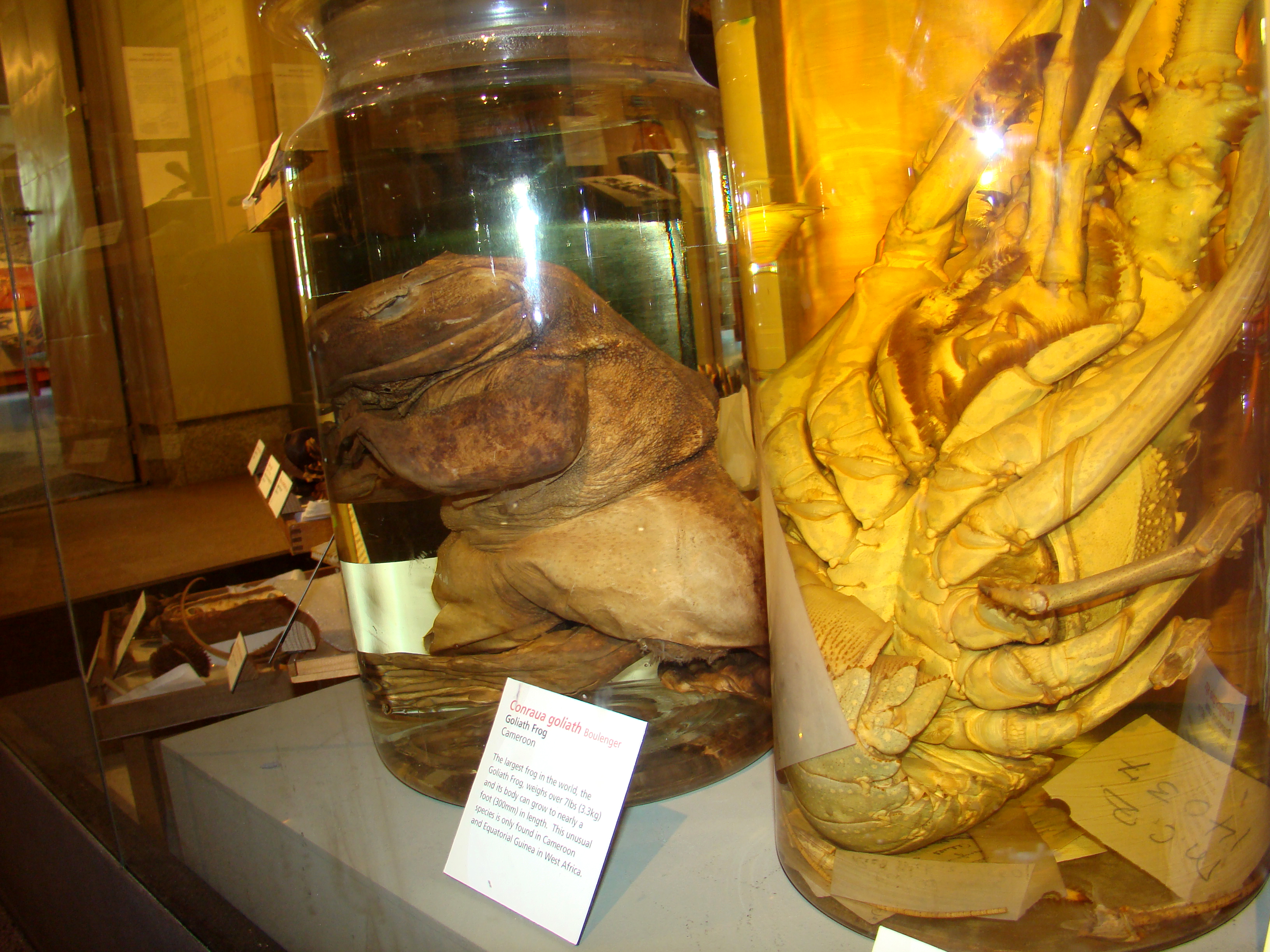
Preserved specimen at the Harvard Museum of Natural History

The primary threat to the goliath frog is hunting, as it is considered a food source in its native range. The IUCN has highlighted the need for conservation measures, in cooperation with local communities, to ensure hunting occurs at sustainable levels. To a lesser extent, they are also threatened by habitat loss and degradation. They have been extensively exported to zoos and the pet trade, but have proven shy and nervous in captivity. Although captives may live longer than their wild counterparts, the species has not been bred in captivity. Due to their classification as an endangered species, the Equatorial Guinean government has declared that no more than 300 goliath frogs may be exported per year for the pet trade, but few now seem to be exported from this country.

== Diet ==
It was determined in a study that the goliath frog consumes a wide variety of food, suggesting that the frog is omnivorous with a carnivorous preference. Their prey are terrestrial, aquatic, and semi-aquatic, indicating that they hunt both on land and in water. Food preferences were different among the different weight groups of frogs, possibly correlating to different stages of development. Frogs weighing less than 400 g (14 oz) consumed annelids, arachnids, myriapods, insects, crustaceans, gastropods, fish, small mammals, reptiles, and amphibians, including newts, salamanders, and smaller frogs (both larval and adult). Frogs weighing more than 1,000 g (35 oz) consumed arachnids, myriapods, insects, crustaceans, and gastropods with a significantly higher occurrence of myriapods. Annelids and reptiles were present only in the diet of lower weight frogs, emphasizing a more diversified diet for younger goliath frogs.

== Reproduction ==
Like most amphibians, water is vital for their reproduction. Because the goliath frog lacks a vocal sac, it does not produce mating calls, a behavior generally present in frogs and toads. The egg masses consist of several hundred to a few thousand eggs, approximately 3.5 mm (0.14 in) each, and often attached to aquatic vegetation. Goliath frogs have been observed to create three main nest types, all semi-circular in shape and located in or near a river. The first type of nest is constructed by clearing a section in an existing river pool. The second is constructed by expand an already existing pool, damming it off from the river. The third is constructed by digging a new pool roughly 1 m (3 ft) wide and 10 cm (4 in) deep, sometimes moving quite large stones in the process. This may partially explain the goliath frog's large size, as larger frogs may be more successful at moving heavy objects when constructing their nests. Adults have also been shown to guard the nests at night. Although not confirmed, there are indications that the nest is constructed by the male, while the female guards the nest with the eggs. Larval development takes between 85 and 95 days.

== Life cycle ==
=== Longevity ===
The goliath frog can live up to 15 years in the wild and up to 21 years in captivity. Due to its large size, Goliath frogs are only known to be preyed on by humans although other predators are possible.

=== Developmental stages ===
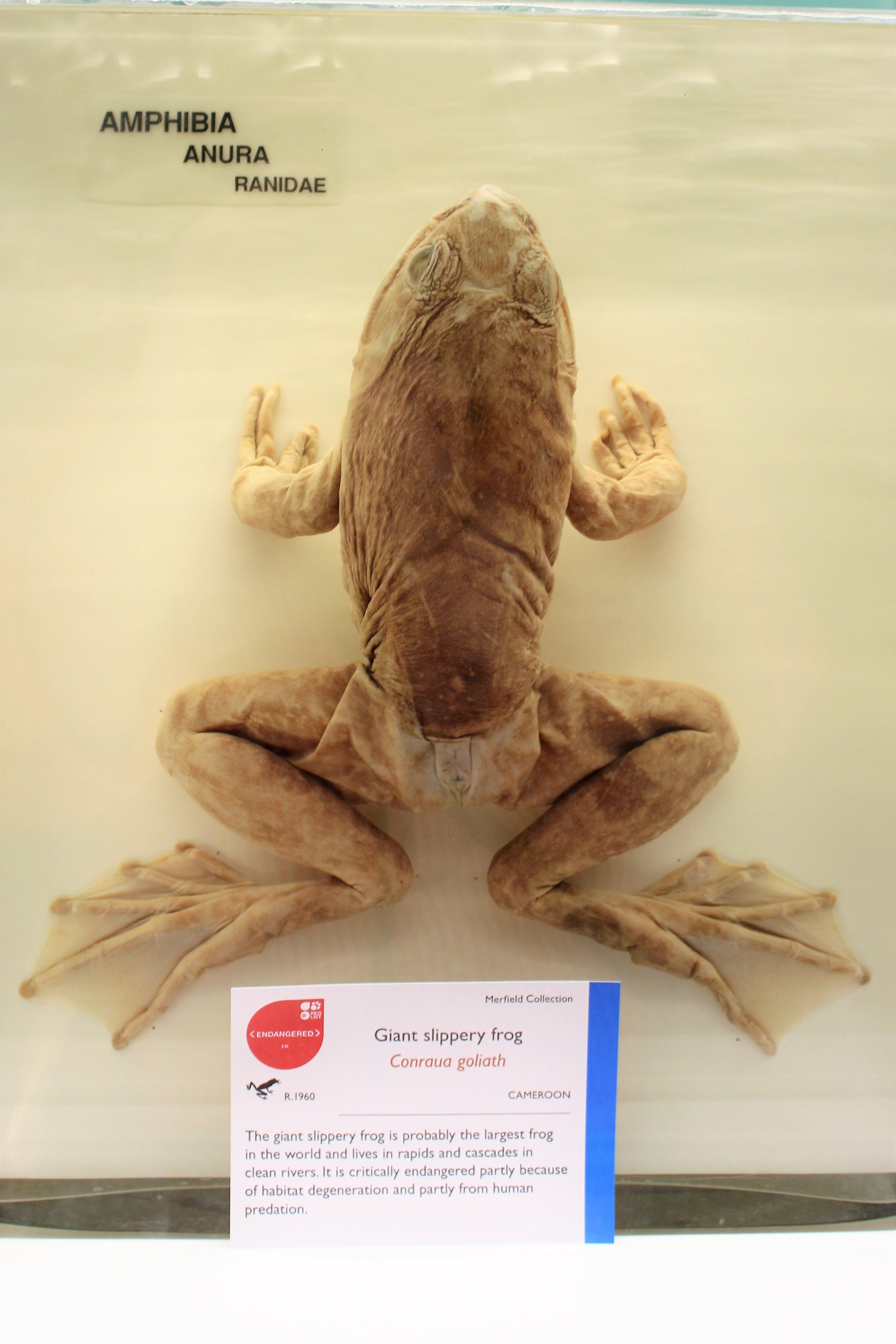
Specimen at the Cambridge University Museum of Zoology

While the reproductive behavior for this species is mostly not well-known, studies by Lamotte, Perret, and Zahl have allowed an overall chronological table of larval development to be created. Typically after 24 hours, the cover of the egg mass becomes yellow and the eggs become dark gray-brown. These egg masses were found attached to the bottom of plants.

==== First month ====
No organs were differentiated and only the ocular region showed significant pigmentation and transparent external gills. The lengths were 8–10 mm (0.31–0.39 in) and while the body/tail appeared to be slightly pigmented, the abdomen was always nearly white.

==== Second month ====
The activity of the tadpoles increased greatly for they are now beginning to feed on leaves. Furthermore, they have developed a denser pigmentation, and the spiraculum and anal tube are now beginning to become visible. Additionally, the mouth and the eyes are beginning to function. Sizes range 19–21 mm (0.75–0.83 in). As the month continues, pigmentation is becoming more intense via the presence of nearly black spots, two rows of teeth are developing on both the upper and lower lip, feeding increases greatly, and their size becomes 24 mm (0.94 in).

==== Third month ====
The posterior legs are now beginning to form and the length of the tadpoles are around 40 mm. As the month progresses, the posterior legs become larger and joints/fingers are becoming more distinguishable. The total length of the tadpoles is now 45 mm. Finally, at the end of the month, anterior legs have fully appeared, posterior legs are grown with long and powerful fingers accompanying this growth, the mouth has become an arched slot line, tail regression has begun, and these tadpoles begin to put their head out of the water in order to breathe.

==== Fourth month ====
All of the specimens in the experiment reached the final stage of metamorphosis. The tail has been either completely or nearly reabsorbed, the shape and color of adults is obtained with slightly lighter and greener pigmentation, the total length is 35 mm (1.4 in). The large size characteristic of these frogs is not obtained yet. The entire process of larval development takes approximately 85–95 days to complete.

== Parental care ==
=== Nesting patterns ===
The goliath frog creates nests as sites for their offspring as a form of parental care. There are three main types of nests: type 1 mainly contains rock pools that were cleared from detritus and leaf litter, type 2 contains existing washouts at riverbanks, and type 3 were depressions dug by the frogs into the gravel riverbanks. Each nest type contains advantages and disadvantages. Nest type 1 was the easiest to create since only cleaning of the substrate was required to create the nest. Consequently, these types of nests were the least reliable since they were usually positioned in the river bed which makes them extremely vulnerable to being washed out by the rising water levels and to having predators enter the nest. Both nest types 2 and 3 were less likely to be washed out, however, they have an increased risk for being dried-up during the dry season. Consequently, while each nest promotes clear advantages, nests are typically constructed depending on the environment cues (whether it is the dry season or the rainy season). All nest types can be used several times, and can consist of three distinct cohorts of tadpoles. The construction of these nests can also explain how the goliath frog became the largest frog. Digging out these nests which exceed 1 m in diameter is an extremely arduous task. Other species which perform this task are also quite large in size. This includes: male African Bullfrogs, Gladiator Frogs, and the Bornean Giant River Frog.

Typically, the goliath frog attaches its eggs either underwater, in small groups to rocks, or in gravel or larger pieces of wood. The construction of the nests may help reduce predation for it would be more difficult for the fish and shrimp (species which typically eat the eggs) to find the eggs and it may prevent the eggs from being washed away by the rapid current. However, in contrast, the changing water levels may also cause an increase in predation, cause more of the eggs to spill out, and increase tadpole mortality as well since the tadpoles and eggs may remain trapped within the nests. Additionally, these nests allow the Goliath frogs to become less dependent on existing structures for egg deposition which can allow these frogs to prolong their breeding season and also increase the amount of suitable breeding sites (they are determined to be suitable by the absence of predators or water presence since water is required for the offspring to survive). The process of constructing a nest for the offspring is used as a method of promoting a male's reproductive benefits to the females. It also serves as the main parental investment since once the female deposits the eggs after fertilization, there is no more parental investment.

== Threats ==
=== Parasites ===
The goliath frog is endangered due to deforestation, overhunting, and parasites. One particular parasite is one species of microfilarial nematode which belongs to genus Icoseilla. This parasite is often found within the blood and lymphatic system and its spread throughout the lymphatic system can cause lethargy and mortality when the infection is serious. This parasite was more prevalent during the dry season which is primarily due to the water speed decreasing thereby allowing more potential breeding sites created. Since there are more breeding sites (their primary habitat is near rivers and waterfalls, but in the dry season, they tend to create breeding sites in areas that contain less water), there would be more opportunity for the mosquitos to infect the frogs thereby increasing the contagion rate. Furthermore, there was a positive relationship detected between host size and parasite abundance: the greater the size of the host, the more intense the infection would be. Within this species, male goliath frogs were found to be more significantly infected when compared to the females which can be due to the weight difference between the two. Additionally, as within most species, as age increases, the severity of the infection will also increase.

=== Helminth parasites ===
There are also parasites that mainly target the gastro-intestinal tract of this frog. These parasites are called helminth parasites which are worm-like parasites divided into three main groups: flukes which are leaf-shaped flatworms, tapeworms which are elongated flatworms that inhabit extraintestinal tissues, and roundworms which inhabit intestinal and extraintestinal sites. The Goliath frog, however, was mainly infected by Nematodes (90.5%) which is a specific type of roundworm. The helminth species discovered within the Goliath frog was extremely similar to those discovered in amphibian hosts in other African countries emphasizing that its location/habitat is the main cause of the prevalence of this predator. However, the Goliath frog was also infected by the nymph of Sebekia sp which could be primarily due to these frogs sharing the same habitat of crocodiles (definitive host) and fishes (intermediate host). Frogs that originate in Loum and Yabassi which are places within Cameroon had the largest variety of helminth species whereas frogs from Nkondjock had the smallest variety. This could be explained by the difference in agricultural activities, deforestation, and poaching. Liver weight was examined to reveal that there is a higher accumulation of toxic products at Loum due to the significant increase in agriculture practice. Consequently, land use effects and their impact on water habitats plays a significant role in the pattern of parasitism and land use by goliath frogs. Additionally, the direct life cycles of the helminths may play an important role in species diversity. Parasites which have direct life cycles spend a majority of their adult life within one host which allows their offspring to be spread from one host to another. These types of parasites also often lack an intermediate stage which means that they must be able to survive in the outside environment as well and be able to establish themselves within a new host. This ability to adapt to new environments contributes greatly to the complexity of helminth communities of goliath frogs.

=== Chytridiomycosis ===
Chytridiomycosis is an infectious disease affecting amphibians, caused by the chytrid fungi Batrachochytrium dendrobatidis and Batrachochytrium salamandrivorans. It has the capability to cause random deaths due to its high mortality rate. These fungi invade the surface layers of the skin, causing damage to the outer keratin layer. As the tadpole continues to grow, more keratin becomes present on the skin thereby allowing the fungus to spread to many parts of the body resulting in the death of the tadpole. Amphibian skin is vital because it is physiologically active meaning it plays important roles in regulating respiration, water, and electrolytes. While the method of how this fungus kills frogs is not known, it can be hypothesized that its invasion through the skin is related since it can cause an electrolyte depletion, osmotic imbalance, and make it more difficult for the frog to breathe. When infected with this fungus, a frog may have discolored skin, peeling on the outside layers of its skin, be sluggish, and have its legs spread slightly away from itself. This fungus is also transmittable since it can be directly transferred through contact between frogs and tadpoles or through exposure to infected water. Thus, it is highly spreadable and with its high mortality rate among frogs, it is extremely deadly.

== Physiology ==
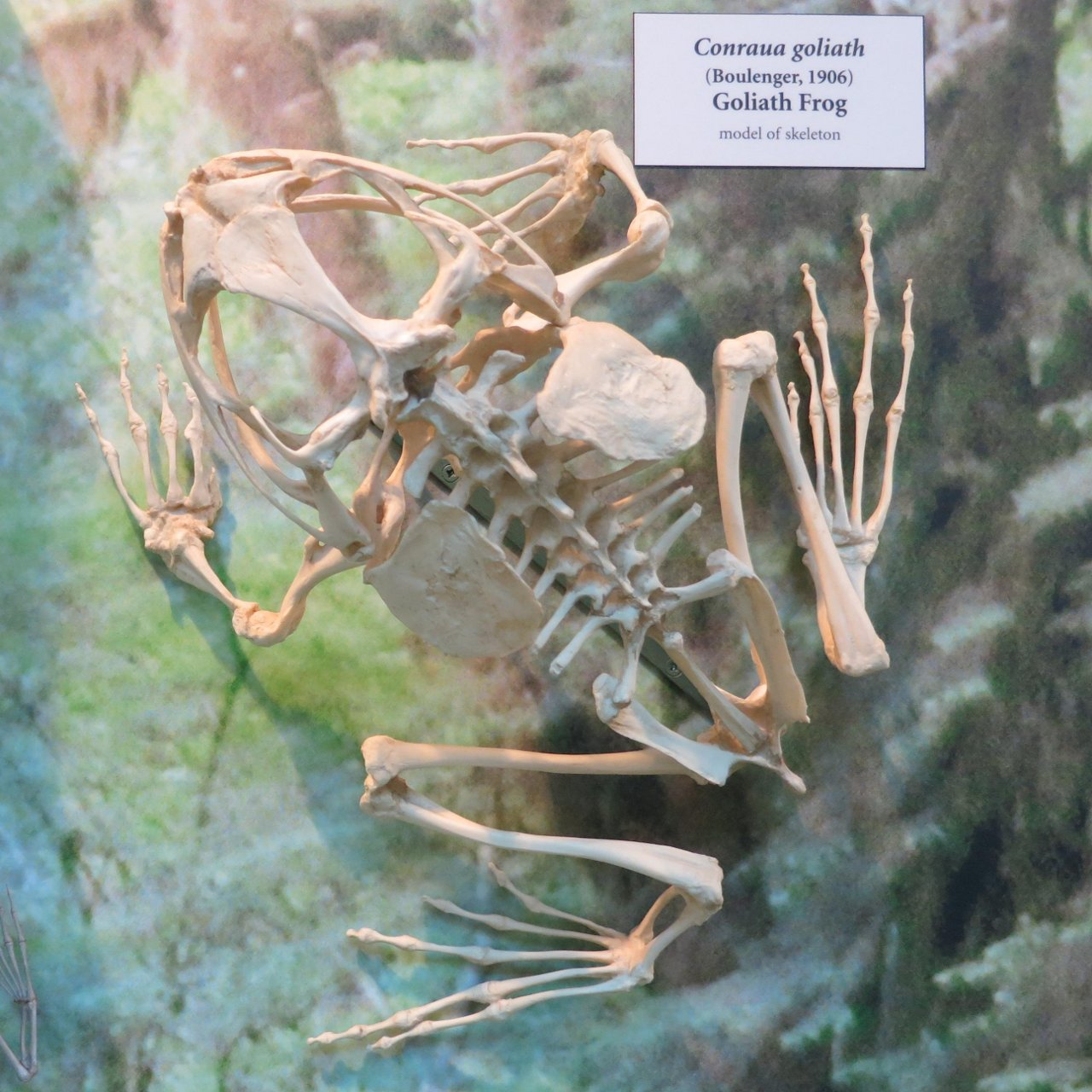
A skeleton of a Goliath frog

The goliath frog contains extensive skin folds to promote respiratory gas exchange at high altitudes. Additionally, the lungs within these frogs are reduced to about one-third of the volume of other frogs and they also contain a smaller heart. This is primarily due to their difference in predation methods. Goliath frogs are typically sit-and-wait predators. This means that they tend to capture/trap their prey either by luring them or using elements of surprise by acting extremely stealthy. As a result, they have a reduced metabolic rate and a unique method of breathing. When attempting to breathe, each buccal movement (a method in which the mouth expands and contracts in order to promote the movement of air into the lungs) pumps air at a rapid rate and the process of getting the oxygen removed from the air is slightly more efficient in this species of frog. These adaptations are very useful for the production of territorial and reproductive calls created by these frogs. Typically, the call of the goliath frog which is produced by the frog opening its mouth is admitted at a high frequency of 4.4 kHz. Furthermore, the goliath frog does not contain a vocal sac which causes the process for making noises/calls for reproduction to be different than most frogs.

== Interactions with humans ==
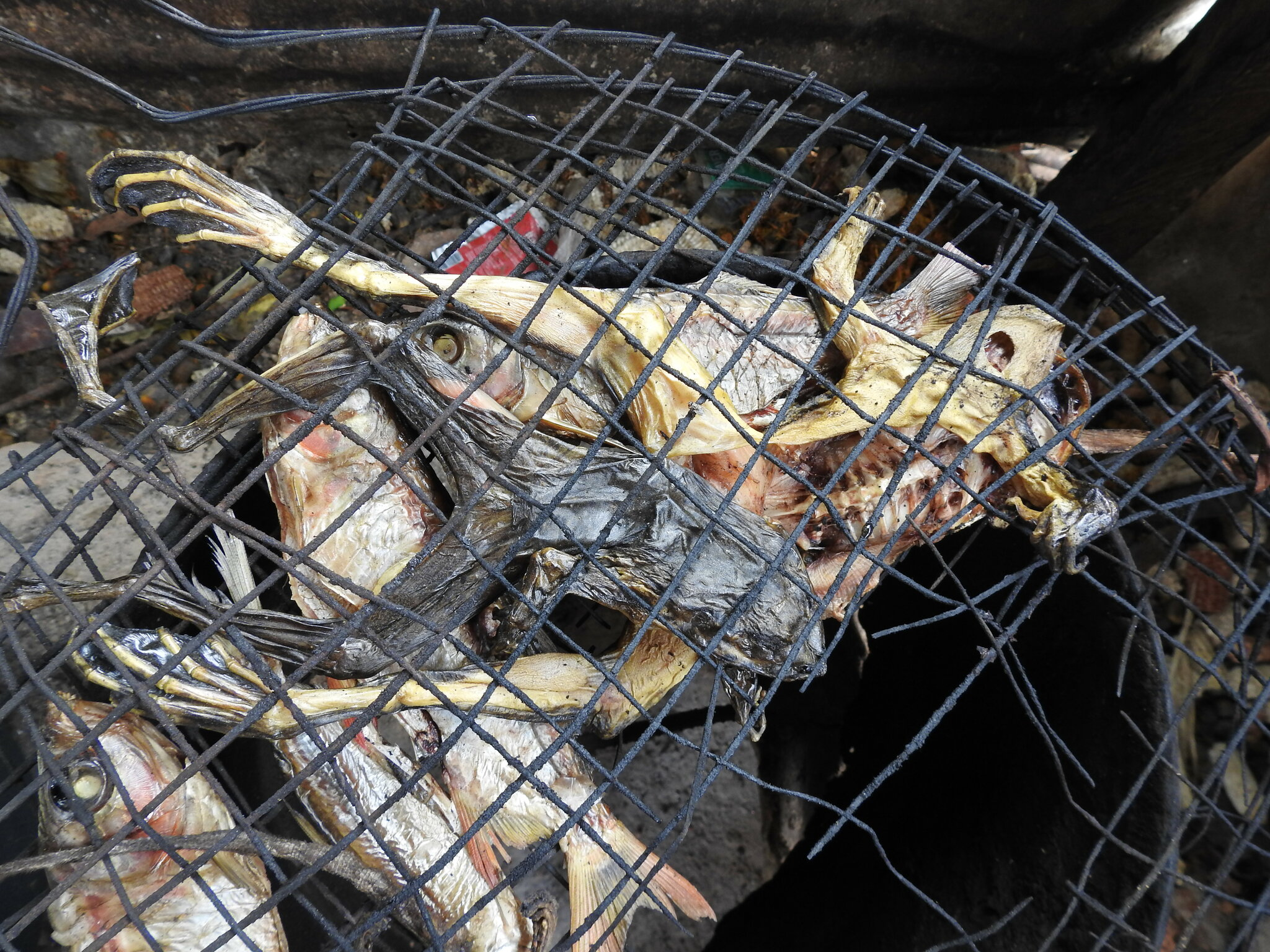
Frogs being grilled alongside some fish in Cameroon

In addition to the impacts of climate change, agriculture, and deforestation, goliath frogs are also threatened by the local practice of hunting them for food. While hunting the frogs, locals will use lanterns to get their attention, then immobilize them using mesh nets. In Nkombia, they may also be captured with nets during the day while they are resting on rocks. However, this method of capture is not very effective, as they are able to jump 1.2 to 3 m (3.9 to 9.8 ft) high, thus easily escaping. Humans are the main predators of this species and the main cause of their endangerment. In order to save the species, hunting and environmental destruction should be limited.

== See also ==
- Helmeted water toad (Calyptocephalella gayi) – A South American species that can reach a similar length, but with a lower maximum weight
- Lake Junin giant frog (Telmatobius macrostomus) – A South American species that is the world's largest exclusively aquatic frog
