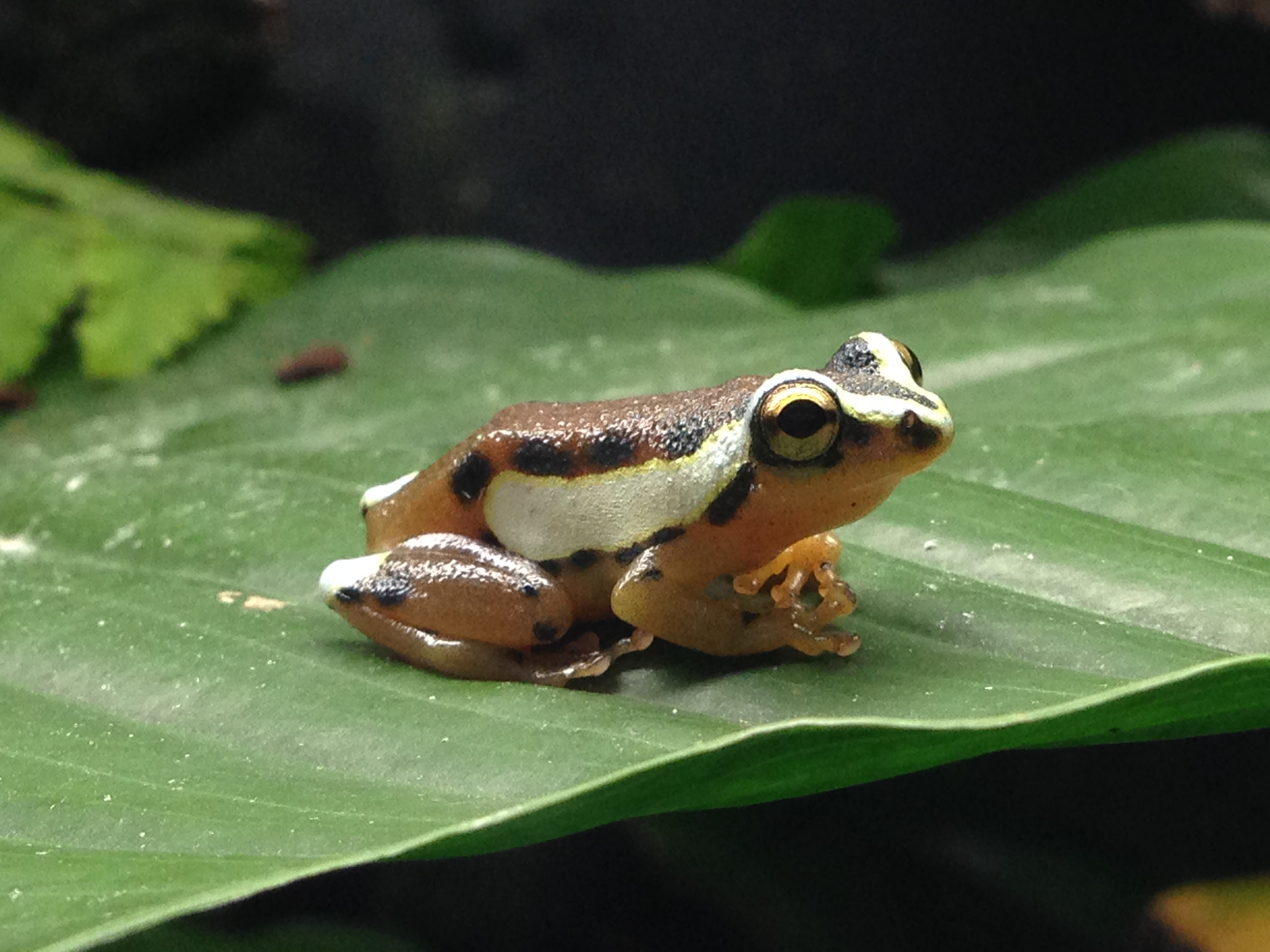

Conservation status
- Least Concern (IUCN 3.1)

Scientific classification
- Kingdom: Animalia
- Phylum: Chordata
- Class: Amphibia
- Order: Anura
- Family: Hyperoliidae
- Genus: Hyperolius
- Species: H. mitchelli

Binomial name
- Hyperolius mitchelli Loveridge, 1953

Synonyms
- Hyperolius puncticulatus mitchelli Loveridge, 1953

= Hyperolius mitchelli =

Species of amphibian

Hyperolius mitchelli (common name: Mitchell's reed frog) is a species of frogs in the family Hyperoliidae. It is found in the area between northeastern Tanzania (including Zanzibar), Malawi, and central Mozambique.

== Taxonomy ==
Hyperolius mitchelli was first described as a subspecies of Hyperolius puncticulatus by Arthur Loveridge based on specimens collected from near "Fort Johnston, Nyasaland", corresponding to modern Mangochi, Malawi, in 1953. In 1975 it was raised to full species status. Hyperolius rubrovermiculatus from Kenya might be a subspecies of Hyperolius mitchelli.

== Etymology ==
Loveridge did not explain the etymology of the specific name mitchelli he chose for this species. However, the general introduction of the report in which the species was described makes many remarks to Mr. B. L. Mitchell, a naturalist from the Nyasaland Game and Tsetse Department. Mitchell had made significant collections in Nyasaland, the focal area of that report. Loveridge specifically thanks Mr. Mitchell for "furnishing [him] with local information regarding the amphibians". In the same report, Loveridge also named Mitchell's flat lizard (Platysaurus mitchelli) after Mitchell.

== Description ==
The female holotype measures 31 mm (1.2 in) in snout–vent length and the male paratype 25 mm (0.98 in). Typically, males measure 23–27 mm (0.91–1.06 in) and females 25–32 mm (0.98–1.26 in) in snout–vent length. There are two distinct colour phases, "J" and "F". Juveniles and many mature males have phase J whereas mature females and some mature males have phase F. Phase J has a brownish dorsum with diffuse darker spots. Phase F has a darker dorsum, or lighter brown with diffuse darker spots, and broad, black-edged silverish canthal and dorsolateral lines. Ventrum is yellow to orange for both phases.

== Habitat and conservation ==
Hyperolius mitchelli inhabit dry forest, farm bush, and low-intensity farmland. Its altitudinal range is from lowlands to 1,200 m (3,900 ft) above sea level. Breeding takes place in permanent and temporary ponds in rather open forest and farm bush. The clutch size is 50–100 eggs, which are laid on vegetation over water. The species is common and tolerates considerable habitat alteration; it is not considered threatened.
