= Montane frog (disambiguation) =

The montane frog is a frog that is endemic to the hills of central Sri Lanka.

Montane frog may also refer to:

- Montane brown frog, a frog endemic to Japan
- Montane marsh frog, a frog endemic to Western Cape, South Africa
- Montane reed frog, a frog native to Kenya
- Montane robber frog, a frog native to Guatemala and southern Mexico
- Montane sheep frog, a frog found in El Salvador, Guatemala, Honduras, and Mexico
