= Hyperolius rhodesianus =

Conservation status
- Least Concern (IUCN 3.1)

Scientific classification
- Kingdom: Animalia
- Phylum: Chordata
- Class: Amphibia
- Order: Anura
- Family: Hyperoliidae
- Genus: Hyperolius
- Species: H. rhodesianus

Binomial name
- Hyperolius rhodesianus Laurent, 1948

Synonyms
- Hyperolius marmoratus rhodesianus Laurent, 1948 "1947"; Hyperolius marginatus rhodesianus — Laurent, 1976

Species of frog

Hyperolius rhodesianus is a species of frog in the family Hyperoliidae. H. rhodesianus is part of the Hyperolius viridiflavus superspecies, and it remains debated whether it should be considered a distinct species. It is currently known from extreme western Zimbabwe, but it is quite likely that its range extends into the adjacent Zambia and possibly Botswana. Common name Laurent's reed frog has been proposed for it.

Hyperolius rhodesianus occurs in emergent vegetation at the margins of swamps, rivers, and lakes in all types of savanna, grassland, and bush land habitats, and in many human-modified habitats such cultivated land and gardens. It will rapidly occupy recently created waterbodies. Breeding takes place in a wide variety of aquatic habitats, ranging from very small to very large ponds—usually temporary, but often also permanent ones. The eggs are deposited directly into the water.

Hyperolius rhodesianus is an extremely abundant and adaptable species that is not facing any significant threats. It occurs in the Hwange National Park and in the Matetsi safari area.
