= Hyperolius camerunensis =

Conservation status
- Least Concern (IUCN 3.1)

Scientific classification
- Kingdom: Animalia
- Phylum: Chordata
- Class: Amphibia
- Order: Anura
- Family: Hyperoliidae
- Genus: Hyperolius
- Species: H. camerunensis

Binomial name
- Hyperolius camerunensis Amiet, 2004

Species of amphibian

Hyperolius camerunensis is a species of reed frog in the family Hyperoliidae. It is endemic to western and southwestern Cameroon.

== Description ==
Adult males measure 21–28 mm (0.8–1.1 in) and adult females 27–32 mm (1.1–1.3 in) in snout–vent length. The snout is short and obtuse. The tympanum is undifferentiated but is sometimes visible in preserved specimens. The fingers and toes bear well-developed discs. The toes are partially webbed. Individuals in "phase J" are translucent green with white dorsolateral stripes, resembling Hyperolius bolifambae and H. riggenbachi of the same phase. The dorsum of "phase F" individuals is grey to yellow with round, red spots. The flanks are black with white specks and the venter is orange.

== Habitat and conservation ==
Hyperolius camerunensis occurs in secondary "farmbush" habitats and in degraded gallery forests at elevations of 450–1,200 m (1,480–3,940 ft) above sea level. It is typically found close to streams. It is likely that breeding takes place in small pools along streams. Hyperolius camerunensis is not common, but because it is an adaptable species, there are probably no significant threats to it. It is not known to occur in protected areas.
