= H. acutirostris =

H. acutirostris may refer to:

- Heteralocha acutirostris, the huia, an extinct bird species of New Zealand
- Hyperolius acutirostris, a frog species

== See also ==
- Acutirostris
