= Hyperolius kuligae =

Conservation status
- Least Concern (IUCN 3.1)

Scientific classification
- Kingdom: Animalia
- Phylum: Chordata
- Class: Amphibia
- Order: Anura
- Family: Hyperoliidae
- Genus: Hyperolius
- Species: H. kuligae

Binomial name
- Hyperolius kuligae Mertens, 1940

Synonyms
- Hyperolius langi kuligae — Perret and Mertens, 1957; Hyperolius platyceps kuligae — Mertens, 1967

Species of frog

Hyperolius kuligae is a species of frog in the family Hyperoliidae. It is found in southwestern Cameroon, Gabon, and Equatorial Guinea and eastward to the central Democratic Republic of the Congo; it probably occurs in northern Republic of the Congo and the Central African Republic too. It is also reported from Uganda, but the status of this population is unclear. The specific name kuligae honours Paul Kuliga (1878–1948), a physician who joined an expedition to Cameroon in 1936. Common names Camp Kivu reed frog and Kuliga reed frog have been proposed for it.

== Description ==
Males grow to 22 mm (0.9 in) and females to 27 mm (1.1 in) in snout–vent length. The snout is blunt. The fingers and the toes are partially webbed and bear terminal discs. The dorsum is grey with a darker hourglass-like pattern. Pale dorsolateral bands may be present. The belly is off-white. Males have pale green to white throat.

The male advertisement call is a high-pitched buzz.

== Habitat and conservation ==
Hyperolius kuligae occurs in the forest–savanna ecotone near water (marshes, roadside ditches, small pools) as well as grassland and degraded forest, sometimes far away from water, but not in open savanna. Breeding takes place in standing bodies of water.

This species appears to be adaptable and is at least locally common. It is therefore unlikely to face major threats. It is present in a number of protected areas.
