= Hyperolius lamottei =

Conservation status
- Least Concern (IUCN 3.1)

Scientific classification
- Kingdom: Animalia
- Phylum: Chordata
- Class: Amphibia
- Order: Anura
- Family: Hyperoliidae
- Genus: Hyperolius
- Species: H. lamottei

Binomial name
- Hyperolius lamottei Laurent, 1958

Species of frog

Hyperolius lamottei is a species of frog in the family Hyperoliidae. It is found in Ivory Coast, Guinea, Liberia, Senegal, Sierra Leone, and possibly Guinea-Bissau. Its natural habitats are subtropical or tropical moist lowland forests, moist savanna, subtropical or tropical seasonally wet or flooded lowland grassland, subtropical or tropical high-altitude grassland, swamps, intermittent freshwater lakes, intermittent freshwater marshes, rural gardens, and heavily degraded former forest.
