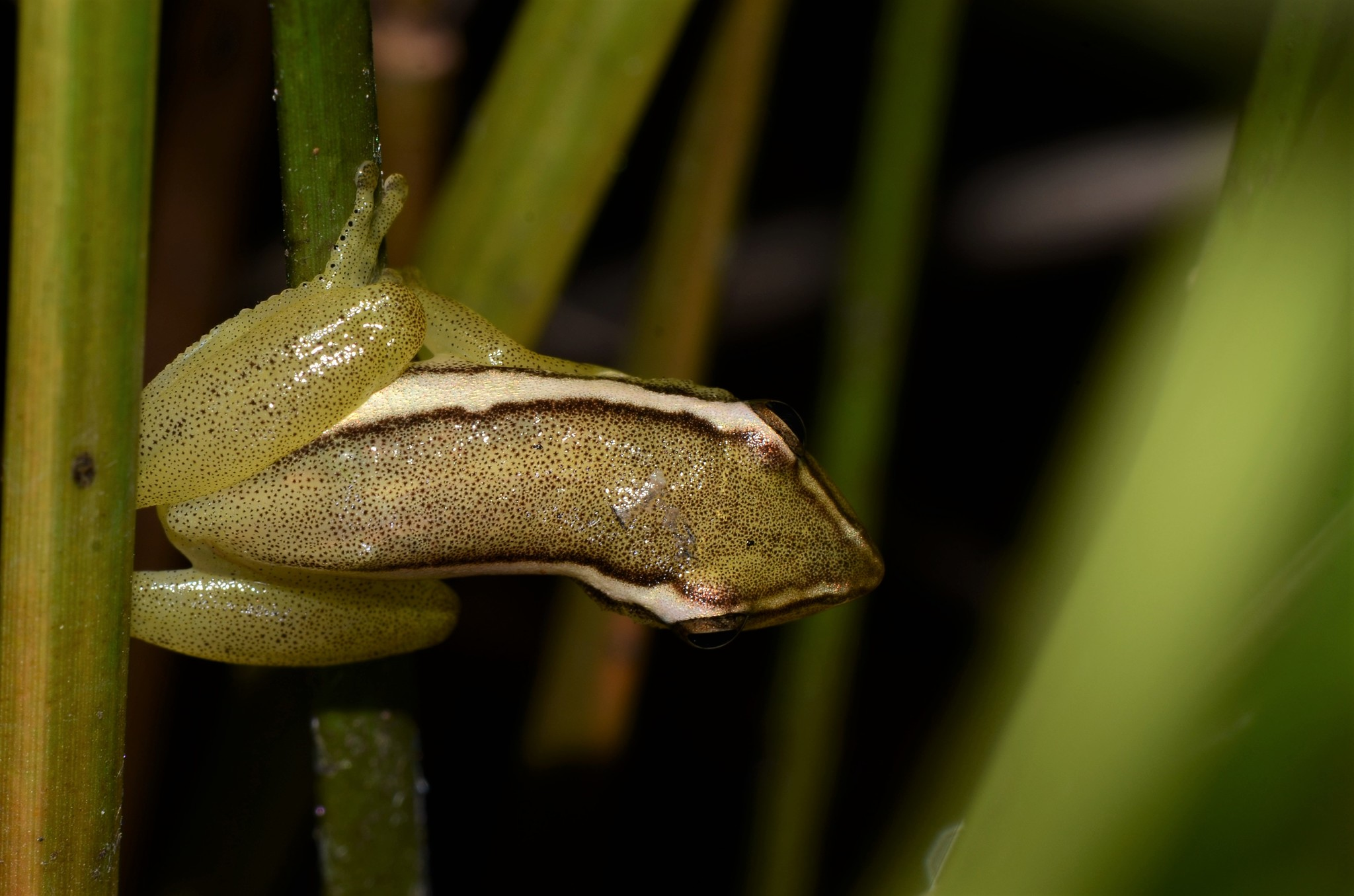

Conservation status
- Least Concern (IUCN 3.1)

Scientific classification
- Kingdom: Animalia
- Phylum: Chordata
- Class: Amphibia
- Order: Anura
- Family: Hyperoliidae
- Genus: Hyperolius
- Species: H. parkeri

Binomial name
- Hyperolius parkeri Loveridge, 1933

= Hyperolius parkeri =

Species of frog

Hyperolius parkeri is a species of frog in the family Hyperoliidae. It is found in Kenya, Mozambique, and Tanzania. Its natural habitats are subtropical or tropical dry forests, moist savanna, rivers, swamps, rural gardens, and heavily degraded former forest.
