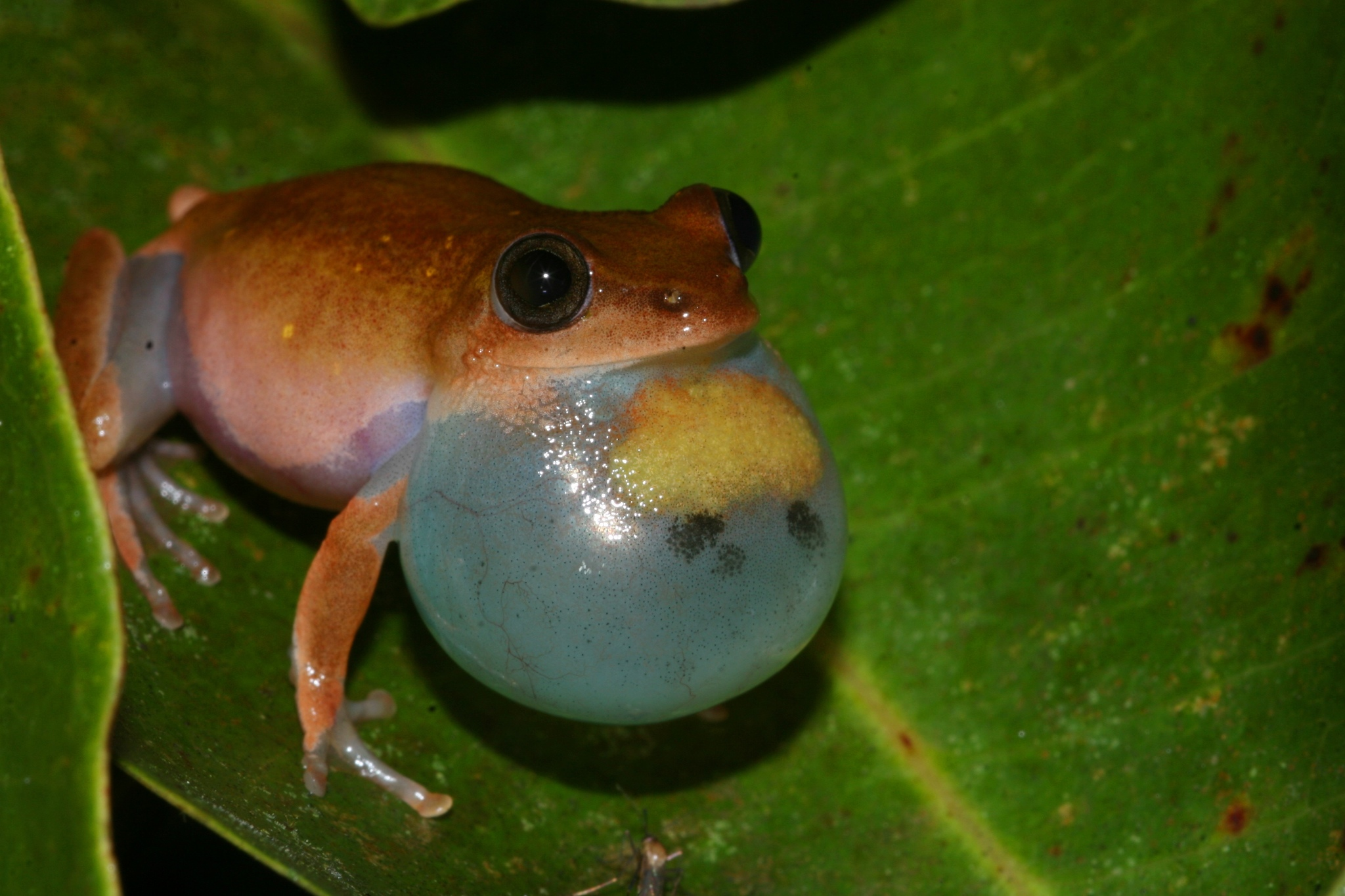
- Fantastic Reed Frog (Hyperolius phantasticus)

Conservation status
- Least Concern (IUCN 3.1)

Scientific classification
- Kingdom: Animalia
- Phylum: Chordata
- Class: Amphibia
- Order: Anura
- Family: Hyperoliidae
- Genus: Hyperolius
- Species: H. phantasticus

Binomial name
- Hyperolius phantasticus (Boulenger, 1899)

= Hyperolius phantasticus =

Species of frog

Hyperolius phantasticus is a species of frog in the family Hyperoliidae. It is found in Cameroon, Central African Republic, Republic of the Congo, Democratic Republic of the Congo, Gabon, possibly Angola, and possibly Equatorial Guinea. Its natural habitats are subtropical or tropical moist lowland forests, subtropical or tropical seasonally wet or flooded lowland grassland, freshwater marshes, intermittent freshwater marshes, rural gardens, heavily degraded former forest, and ponds.
