= Hyperolius mosaicus =

Conservation status
- Least Concern (IUCN 3.1)

Scientific classification
- Kingdom: Animalia
- Phylum: Chordata
- Class: Amphibia
- Order: Anura
- Family: Hyperoliidae
- Genus: Hyperolius
- Species: H. mosaicus

Binomial name
- Hyperolius mosaicus Perret, 1959

Species of frog

Hyperolius mosaicus is a species of frog in the family Hyperoliidae. It is found in Cameroon and Gabon, presumably also in the Republic of the Congo and Equatorial Guinea, and possibly in the western Central African Republic. Its natural habitat is tropical moist lowland forests. It is an uncommon, strictly arboreal species that breeds using water in tree holes. Presumably, it is threatened by habitat loss caused by logging, agriculture, and human settlements.
