= Hyperolius adspersus =

Conservation status
- Least Concern (IUCN 3.1)

Scientific classification
- Kingdom: Animalia
- Phylum: Chordata
- Class: Amphibia
- Order: Anura
- Family: Hyperoliidae
- Genus: Hyperolius
- Species: H. adspersus

Binomial name
- Hyperolius adspersus Peters, 1877

Synonyms
- Rappia granulata Boulenger, 1901; Hyperolius granulatus (Boulenger, 1901); Hyperolius nasutus adspersus

Species of frog

Hyperolius adspersus is a species of frog in the family Hyperoliidae. It is known from western and southern Cameroon (outside the coastal plain), Gabon, Republic of the Congo, Cabinda Enclave of Angola, and western Democratic Republic of the Congo. It probably occurs Equatorial Guinea too. Common name sprinkled long reed frog has been coined for this species.

Hyperolius adspersus occurs in open secondary habitats in the forest zone from near sea level to 800 m (2,600 ft) above sea level. It does not occur in closed-canopy forest but appears to be capable of crossing unsuitable habitat because it is able to colonize open habitats inside undisturbed forest. Breeding takes place in marshes and pools, including human-made ones. No threats to this apparently common species are known. It is assumed to occur in some protected areas.
