= Hyperolius ademetzi =

Conservation status
- Endangered (IUCN 3.1)

Scientific classification
- Kingdom: Animalia
- Phylum: Chordata
- Class: Amphibia
- Order: Anura
- Family: Hyperoliidae
- Genus: Hyperolius
- Species: H. ademetzi

Binomial name
- Hyperolius ademetzi Ahl, 1931

Species of frog

Hyperolius ademetzi is a species of frog in the family Hyperoliidae. It is endemic to Cameroon. Its natural habitats are moist savanna, subtropical or tropical high-altitude shrubland, subtropical or tropical high-altitude grassland, rivers, freshwater lakes, freshwater marshes, and intermittent freshwater marshes. It is threatened by habitat loss.
