= Hyperolius kibarae =

Conservation status
- Data Deficient (IUCN 3.1)

Scientific classification
- Kingdom: Animalia
- Phylum: Chordata
- Class: Amphibia
- Order: Anura
- Family: Hyperoliidae
- Genus: Hyperolius
- Species: H. kibarae

Binomial name
- Hyperolius kibarae Laurent, 1957

Species of frog

Hyperolius kibarae is a species of frog in the family Hyperoliidae. It is endemic to Democratic Republic of the Congo. Its natural habitats are moist savanna, subtropical or tropical high-altitude grassland, swamps, and intermittent freshwater marshes.
