= Hyperolius steindachneri =

Conservation status
- Least Concern (IUCN 3.1)

Scientific classification
- Kingdom: Animalia
- Phylum: Chordata
- Class: Amphibia
- Order: Anura
- Family: Hyperoliidae
- Genus: Hyperolius
- Species: H. steindachneri

Binomial name
- Hyperolius steindachneri Bocage, 1866

Species of frog

Hyperolius steindachneri is a species of African frog in the family Hyperoliidae.

== Etymology ==
The specific name, steindachneri, is in honor of Viennese zoologist Franz Steindachner.

== Geographic distribution ==
Hyperolius steindachneri is found in Angola, the Democratic Republic of the Congo, and Zambia.

== Habitat ==
The natural habitats of Hyperolius steindachneri are swamps, freshwater marshes, and intermittent freshwater marshes.
