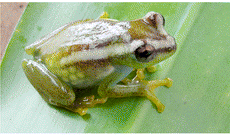

Conservation status
- Critically Endangered (IUCN 3.1)

Scientific classification
- Kingdom: Animalia
- Phylum: Chordata
- Class: Amphibia
- Order: Anura
- Family: Hyperoliidae
- Genus: Hyperolius
- Species: H. tanneri

Binomial name
- Hyperolius tanneri Schiøtz, 1982

Synonyms
- Hyperolius tannerorum Schiøtz, 1982 — unjustified emendation

= Hyperolius tanneri =

Species of amphibian

Hyperolius tanneri is a species of frogs in the family Hyperoliidae. It is endemic to the West Usambara Mountains in northeastern Tanzania. Common name Tanner's reed frog has been coined for this species.

== Etymology ==
The specific name tanneri honours John and Lucie Tanner, owners of a tea estate in Mazumbai (the type locality) and noted for welcoming visiting zoologist. In this case, the plural form tannerorum would have been technically correct, and in his later work Arne Schiøtz, the scientist who described the species in 1982, amended the spelling accordingly. However, this is considered "unjustified emendation", and the correct name of the species follows the original spelling.

== Description ==
Males measure 20–23 mm (0.79–0.91 in) and females 29–34 mm (1.1–1.3 in) in snout–vent length. In addition to sexual size dimorphism, males differ from females by having rather large, smooth gular flap. The dorsum is green and has light canthal and dorsolateral stripes. The fingers and toes are yellow, and the throat and ventrum are blue-green.

Hyperolius tanneri resembles Hyperolius spinigularis, but lacks the black spines on the throat and ventrum of the latter.

== Habitat and conservation ==
Its natural habitats are undisturbed montane forests. It is only known from two sites, one near the Mazumbai Forest Reserve at 1,410 m (4,630 ft) above sea level, and the other one in the Shume-Magambo Forest Reserve at 1,920 m (6,300 ft) asl. The only known breeding site is a small forest swamp that is bordering a small stream in Mazumbai (suitable swamp also exists in Shume-Magambo).

This species is believed to be decreasing because of habitat loss, caused by agricultural expansion, logging and expanding human settlements. While it occurs in or near protected areas, additional habitat protection would be needed. Because the species is only known from two sites in one location suffering from habitat loss, it has been assessed as "Critically Endangered" by the International Union for Conservation of Nature (IUCN).
