= Hyperolius igbettensis =

Conservation status
- Least Concern (IUCN 3.1)

Scientific classification
- Kingdom: Animalia
- Phylum: Chordata
- Class: Amphibia
- Order: Anura
- Family: Hyperoliidae
- Genus: Hyperolius
- Species: H. igbettensis

Binomial name
- Hyperolius igbettensis Schiøtz, 1963

Synonyms
- Hyperolius nasutus igbettensis Schiøtz, 1963

Species of frog

Hyperolius igbettensis is a species of frog in the family Hyperoliidae. It is found in West Africa from Guinea eastward to Liberia, Ivory Coast, Ghana, Togo and Benin (confirmed records from these two countries are lacking), Nigeria, and into Central Africa at least to Cameroon but likely further east to the Central African Republic and southwestern Chad; the eastern border of distribution of this species relative to other members in the Hyperolius nasutus complex is unclear. Common name Igbetti long reed frog has been coined for it (spelling "Igebetti" is also used). The type locality is near Igbetti, a village in Oyo State, Nigeria.

== Description ==
Males from Nigeria measure 22–22.5 mm (0.9–0.9 in) and females 22.5–23 mm (0.9–0.9 in) in snout–vent length; materials from Cameroon indicate a maximum length of 24.5 mm (1.0 in) for both sexes. The body is long and slender. The fingers and toes are webbed and bear discs; the toe are more webbed but bear smaller discs than the fingers. Colouration is variable, ranging from a light bluish green to grass green or almost green-brown. The shanks and the arms are almost transparent blue-green. The flanks, back and thighs are darker green and bear many small dark spots that may be arranged along vertebral line into a broken line. The head might be darker (reddish brown) than rest of the upper surfaces. Some specimens, primarily males, have a light white to yellow dorsolateral stripe. The canthal stripe is dark. The iris is reddish and bordered by narrow blue line. The ventral surfaces are light and the belly is whitish, often almost transparent. In females, the eggs are visible through the body wall.

The male advertisement call consists of an initial brief note with 12 pulses, and is followed by five slower pulses, with a duration of 0.12 seconds.

== Habitat and conservation ==
Hyperolius igbettensis occurs in savannas and grassy habitats, but not in drier areas. Breeding takes place near pools, grassy flooded areas, and ditches. The males call from grasses above water.

Hyperolius igbettensis is probably a common species. Threats to it are poorly known, but it is unlikely to face significant threats. It probably occurs in several protected areas.
