= Hyperolius chlorosteus =

Conservation status
- Least Concern (IUCN 3.1)

Scientific classification
- Kingdom: Animalia
- Phylum: Chordata
- Class: Amphibia
- Order: Anura
- Family: Hyperoliidae
- Genus: Hyperolius
- Species: H. chlorosteus

Binomial name
- Hyperolius chlorosteus (E. Boulenger, 1915)

Species of frog

Hyperolius chlorosteus is a species of frog in the family Hyperoliidae. It is found in Ivory Coast, Guinea, Liberia, and Sierra Leone. Its natural habitats are subtropical or tropical moist lowland forests and rivers. It is threatened by habitat loss, but remains a Least-concern species.
