= Hyperolius langi =

Conservation status
- Least Concern (IUCN 3.1)

Scientific classification
- Kingdom: Animalia
- Phylum: Chordata
- Class: Amphibia
- Order: Anura
- Family: Hyperoliidae
- Genus: Hyperolius
- Species: H. langi

Binomial name
- Hyperolius langi Noble, 1924

Species of frog

Hyperolius langi is a species of frog in the family Hyperoliidae. It is found in Democratic Republic of the Congo, possibly Rwanda, and possibly Uganda. Its natural habitats are subtropical or tropical moist lowland forests, subtropical or tropical moist montane forests, rivers, freshwater marshes, and intermittent freshwater marshes. It is threatened by habitat loss.
