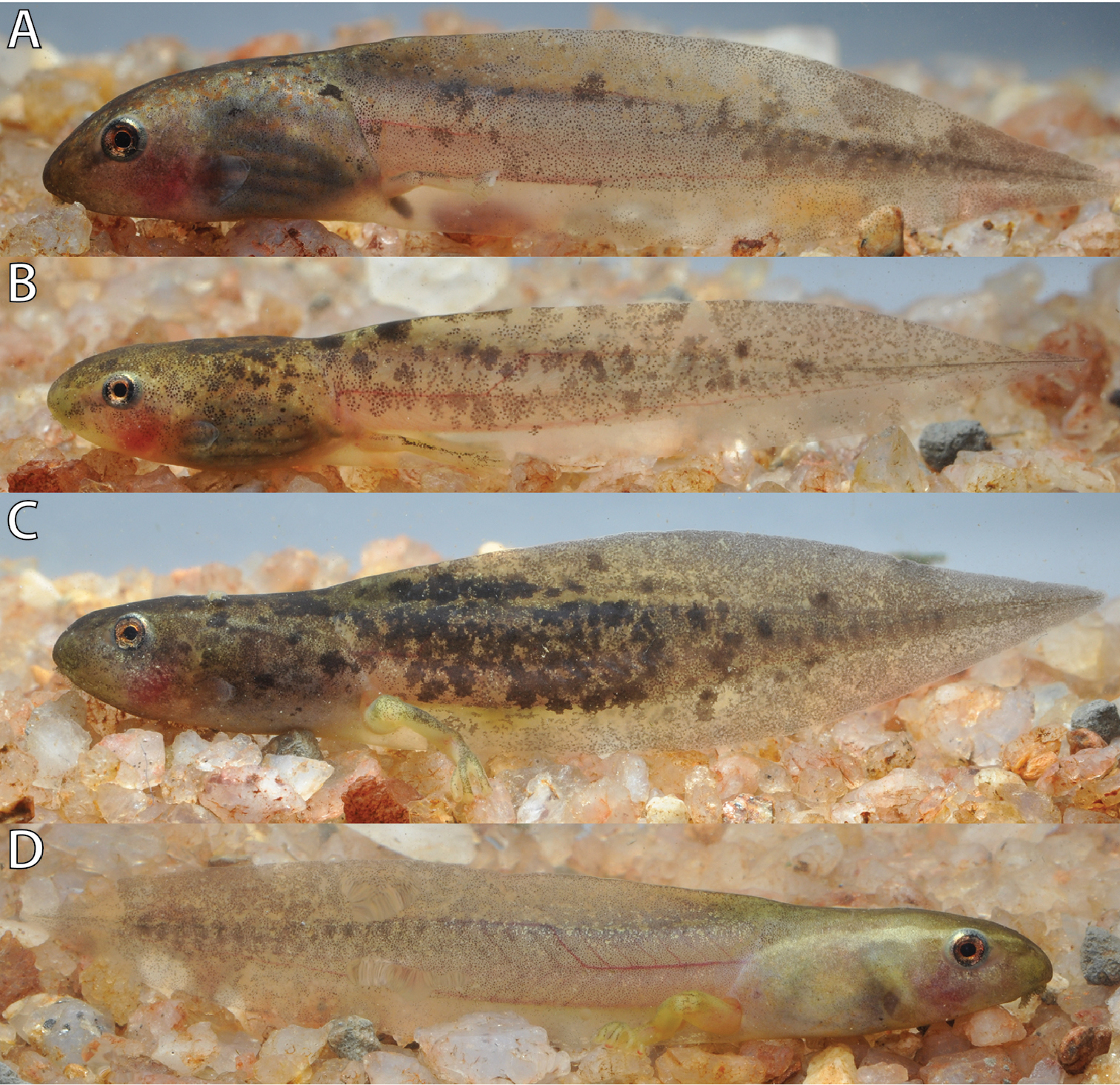
- Tadpoles

Scientific classification
- Domain: Eukaryota
- Kingdom: Animalia
- Phylum: Chordata
- Class: Amphibia
- Order: Anura
- Family: Hyperoliidae
- Genus: Hyperolius
- Species: H. jackie

Binomial name
- Hyperolius jackie Dehling, 2012

= Hyperolius jackie =

Amphibian species

Hyperolius jackie, known by the common name as Jackie's reed frog, is an amphibian in the family Hyperoliidae. The frog is found in the Nyungwe National Park, southern Rwanda.
