= Hyperolius pustulifer =

Conservation status
- Data Deficient (IUCN 3.1)

Scientific classification
- Kingdom: Animalia
- Phylum: Chordata
- Class: Amphibia
- Order: Anura
- Family: Hyperoliidae
- Genus: Hyperolius
- Species: H. pustulifer

Binomial name
- Hyperolius pustulifer Laurent, 1940

Species of frog

Hyperolius pustulifer is a species of frog in the family Hyperoliidae. It is found in Democratic Republic of the Congo and possibly Burundi. Its natural habitats are rivers, freshwater marshes, and intermittent freshwater marshes.
