= Hyperolius stenodactylus =

Conservation status
- Data Deficient (IUCN 3.1)

Scientific classification
- Kingdom: Animalia
- Phylum: Chordata
- Class: Amphibia
- Order: Anura
- Family: Hyperoliidae
- Genus: Hyperolius
- Species: H. stenodactylus

Binomial name
- Hyperolius stenodactylus Ahl, 1931

Species of frog

Hyperolius stenodactylus is a species of frog in the family Hyperoliidae. It is endemic to Cameroon. Its natural habitats are rivers, freshwater marshes, and intermittent freshwater marshes.
