= Hyperolius thoracotuberculatus =

Conservation status
- Data Deficient (IUCN 3.1)

Scientific classification
- Kingdom: Animalia
- Phylum: Chordata
- Class: Amphibia
- Order: Anura
- Family: Hyperoliidae
- Genus: Hyperolius
- Species: H. thoracotuberculatus

Binomial name
- Hyperolius thoracotuberculatus Ahl, 1931

Purported species of frog

Hyperolius thoracotuberculatus is a purported species of frog in the family Hyperoliidae. It is only known from the imprecise type locality "Africa" and is not possible to match this name with any living populations of frogs. It can be considered as nomen dubium or as a nomen inquirendum. The common name warty reed frog has been coined for it.
