= Hyperolius viridigulosus =

Conservation status
- Near Threatened (IUCN 3.1)

Scientific classification
- Kingdom: Animalia
- Phylum: Chordata
- Class: Amphibia
- Order: Anura
- Family: Hyperoliidae
- Genus: Hyperolius
- Species: H. viridigulosus

Binomial name
- Hyperolius viridigulosus Schiøtz, 1967

Species of frog

Hyperolius viridigulosus is a species of frog in the family Hyperoliidae. It is found in Ivory Coast and Ghana. Its natural habitat is subtropical or tropical moist lowland forests. It is threatened by habitat loss.
