= Hyperolius obstetricans =

Conservation status
- Least Concern (IUCN 3.1)

Scientific classification
- Kingdom: Animalia
- Phylum: Chordata
- Class: Amphibia
- Order: Anura
- Family: Hyperoliidae
- Genus: Hyperolius
- Species: H. obstetricans

Binomial name
- Hyperolius obstetricans Ahl, 1931

Synonyms
- Alexteroon obstetricans (Ahl, 1931)

Species of amphibian

Hyperolius obstetricans, or frilled egg-guarding frog, is a species of frog in the family Hyperoliidae. It is known from southern and south-western Cameroon, Equatorial Guinea, Gabon, and northern Angola; it is likely to occur in the intervening Republic of the Congo and Democratic Republic of the Congo.

== Description ==
Hyperolius obstetricans grow to 31 mm (1.2 in) in snout–vent length. The body is slender while the head is broad with a rounded snout. The eyes are large. The tympanum is distinct. The finger and toe tips are enlarged into large, rounded discs; the fingers have medium webbing while the toes have almost complete webbing. Dorsal skin is granular. The dorsum is blueish green-grey, grass- or olive-green to brownish green with many minute white dots and possibly with some darker markings on the head and shoulders; the region from the eyelids to the nostrils is brownish. Skin is ventrally finely granular. The anterior part of the throat is white while the posterior part is dark blue in males and turquoise in females. The belly is translucent turquoise to black, with the inner organs visible through the skin.

The male advertisement call is a slow, metallic "tuc" that is repeated 5–6 times.

== Habitat and conservation ==
Hyperolius obstetricans occurs in forests at elevations below 800 m (2,600 ft) in association with narrow streams under continuous canopy. Its favoured streams have well-aerated, flowing, but not torrential water. The eggs are laid in small clumps on leaves above streams, into which the tadpoles fall and develop further. It is a common but patchily distributed species that is often absent from apparently suitable habitat. It is probably threatened by loss of closed-canopy forests. It is present in the Moukalaba-Doudou National Park (Gabon) and probably in some other protected areas too.
