= Hyperolius inyangae =

Conservation status
- Vulnerable (IUCN 3.1)

Scientific classification
- Kingdom: Animalia
- Phylum: Chordata
- Class: Amphibia
- Order: Anura
- Family: Hyperoliidae
- Genus: Hyperolius
- Species: H. inyangae

Binomial name
- Hyperolius inyangae Channing, 2013

Species of frog

Hyperolius inyangae, commonly known as the Nyanga long reed frog, is a species of frog in the family Hyperoliidae.

The current described range is limited to the Nyanga National Park in Zimbabwe, which it is named after. It inhabits a range of watery sites in highland areas along the eastern Zimbabwe-Mozambique border.
