= Hyperolius bopeleti =

Conservation status
- Vulnerable (IUCN 3.1)

Scientific classification
- Kingdom: Animalia
- Phylum: Chordata
- Class: Amphibia
- Order: Anura
- Family: Hyperoliidae
- Genus: Hyperolius
- Species: H. bopeleti

Binomial name
- Hyperolius bopeleti Amiet, 1980

Species of amphibian

Hyperolius bopeleti, also known as the Dizangue reed frog or Bopelet's reed frog, is a species of frog in the family Hyperoliidae. It is endemic to the coastal southwestern Cameroon. The specific name bopeleti honours M. Bopelet, a Cameroonian biologist.

== Description ==
Males and females both grow to 22 mm (0.9 in) in snout–vent length. The body and limbs are warty. The snout is blunt. The fingers and the toes are partially webbed and bear terminal discs. The dorsum is grey with a darker hourglass-like pattern. The belly is blue-green. Males have yellow throat. This species does not show sex- or phase-related colour polymorphism.

The male advertisement call is a high-pitched, metallic click.

== Habitat and conservation ==
Hyperolius bopeleti occurs in degraded former forest (farm bush) at elevations less than 200 m (660 ft) above sea level; it can live within a few meters of the sea. Reproduction takes place in small pools. Clutches of about 100 eggs are deposited high above the water (4–5 m) into which the larvae eventually fall.

Although this species appears adaptable, it is uncommon and its range is small; expanding agriculture and human settlements are probable threats to it. It is not known to occur in any protected areas.
