= Hyperolius polystictus =

Conservation status
- Vulnerable (IUCN 3.1)

Scientific classification
- Kingdom: Animalia
- Phylum: Chordata
- Class: Amphibia
- Order: Anura
- Family: Hyperoliidae
- Genus: Hyperolius
- Species: H. polystictus

Binomial name
- Hyperolius polystictus Laurent, 1943

Species of frog

Hyperolius polystictus is a species of frog in the family Hyperoliidae. It is endemic to Democratic Republic of the Congo. Its natural habitats are subtropical or tropical moist lowland forests and rivers.
