= Hyperolius pardalis =

Conservation status
- Least Concern (IUCN 3.1)

Scientific classification
- Kingdom: Animalia
- Phylum: Chordata
- Class: Amphibia
- Order: Anura
- Family: Hyperoliidae
- Genus: Hyperolius
- Species: H. pardalis

Binomial name
- Hyperolius pardalis Laurent, 1948

Species of frog

Hyperolius pardalis is a species of frog in the family Hyperoliidae. It is found in Cameroon, Central African Republic, Republic of the Congo, Equatorial Guinea, Gabon, and possibly Democratic Republic of the Congo. Its natural habitats are subtropical or tropical moist lowland forests, rivers, swamps, freshwater marshes, intermittent freshwater marshes, rural gardens, heavily degraded former forest, and ponds.
