= Hyperolius viridis =

Conservation status
- Least Concern (IUCN 3.1)

Scientific classification
- Kingdom: Animalia
- Phylum: Chordata
- Class: Amphibia
- Order: Anura
- Family: Hyperoliidae
- Genus: Hyperolius
- Species: H. viridis

Binomial name
- Hyperolius viridis Schiøtz, 1975

Species of frog

Hyperolius viridis is a species of frog in the family Hyperoliidae. It is found in Tanzania, possibly Democratic Republic of the Congo, possibly Malawi, and possibly Zambia. Its natural habitats are subtropical or tropical seasonally wet or flooded lowland grassland, subtropical or tropical high-altitude grassland, and intermittent freshwater marshes. It is threatened by habitat loss.
