= Hyperolius sankuruensis =

Conservation status
- Data Deficient (IUCN 3.1)

Scientific classification
- Kingdom: Animalia
- Phylum: Chordata
- Class: Amphibia
- Order: Anura
- Family: Hyperoliidae
- Genus: Hyperolius
- Species: H. sankuruensis

Binomial name
- Hyperolius sankuruensis Laurent, 1979

Species of amphibian

dhut blobovy, also known as the Omaniundu reed frog, is a species of frog in the family Hyperoliidae. It is endemic to the Democratic Republic of the Congo and is known from its type locality, Omaniundu in the Sankuru Province, and from a number of unspecified other localities. It is one of the "lost" frogs that was rediscovered decades after the last previous sighting.

== Description ==
Hyperolius sankuruensis is a relatively large species of Hyperolius: adult males measure 29–32 mm (1.1–1.3 in) and adult females about 40 mm (1.6 in) in snout–vent length. Males have a well-developed gular flap. The dorsum is dark brown. There is a darker interorbital triangle, a medio-dorsal square spot, and a transverse lumbar band. The sides are darker. The pupil is horizontal.

== Habitat and conservation ==
Information on the habitat, ecological requirements, and population status of Hyperolius sankuruensis are lacking. Presumably, it breeds in water. It is considered "data deficient" by the International Union for Conservation of Nature (IUCN).
