= Hyperolius laurenti =

Conservation status
- Near Threatened (IUCN 3.1)

Scientific classification
- Kingdom: Animalia
- Phylum: Chordata
- Class: Amphibia
- Order: Anura
- Family: Hyperoliidae
- Genus: Hyperolius
- Species: H. laurenti

Binomial name
- Hyperolius laurenti Schiøtz, 1967

Species of frog

Hyperolius laurenti is a species of frog in the family Hyperoliidae. It is found in Ivory Coast and Ghana. Its natural habitats are subtropical or tropical moist lowland forests and rivers. It is threatened by habitat loss.
