= Hyperolius bobirensis =

Conservation status
- Vulnerable (IUCN 3.1)

Scientific classification
- Kingdom: Animalia
- Phylum: Chordata
- Class: Amphibia
- Order: Anura
- Family: Hyperoliidae
- Genus: Hyperolius
- Species: H. bobirensis

Binomial name
- Hyperolius bobirensis Schiøtz, 1967

Species of frog

Hyperolius bobirensis is a species of frog in the family Hyperoliidae. It is endemic to Ghana. Its natural habitats are subtropical or tropical moist lowland forests and intermittent freshwater marshes. It is threatened by habitat loss.
