= Hyperolius inornatus =

Conservation status
- Data Deficient (IUCN 3.1)

Scientific classification
- Kingdom: Animalia
- Phylum: Chordata
- Class: Amphibia
- Order: Anura
- Family: Hyperoliidae
- Genus: Hyperolius
- Species: H. inornatus

Binomial name
- Hyperolius inornatus Laurent, 1943

Species of frog

Hyperolius inornatus is a species of frog in the family Hyperoliidae. It is endemic to Democratic Republic of the Congo. Its natural habitats are rivers, swamps, freshwater marshes, and intermittent freshwater marshes.
