= Hyperolius pseudargus =

Conservation status
- Least Concern (IUCN 3.1)

Scientific classification
- Kingdom: Animalia
- Phylum: Chordata
- Class: Amphibia
- Order: Anura
- Family: Hyperoliidae
- Genus: Hyperolius
- Species: H. pseudargus

Binomial name
- Hyperolius pseudargus Schiøtz and Westergaard, 1999

Species of amphibian

Hyperolius pseudargus, also known as Mette's reed frog, is a species of frog in the family Hyperoliidae. It is endemic to south-central Tanzania and occurs in the Udzungwa Mountains and south to Njombe in the Southern Highlands. Male Hyperolius pseudargus greatly resemble Hyperolius argus but have less webbing between the toes and the male advertisement call is different. The vernacular name refers to the Danish biologist Mette Westergaard, who collected the holotype and is the co-describer of this species.

== Description ==
Males measure 31–35 mm (1.2–1.4 in) in snout–vent length. The body and head are broad and flat. The eyes are not very protruding. Webbing between the toes is reduced. The dorsum is green with narrow yellow canthal and dorsolateral stripes, although these may sometimes be indistinct; small yellow dots are usually present. The upper eyelid is yellow or slightly reddish. The ventrum is yellow. The toes and fingers are yellow-green. Males have a large vocal sac that is bluish when calling, yellow green otherwise.

The male advertisement call is a fast series of very loud, harsh clicks, emitted in a somewhat accelerating rhythm.

== Habitat and conservation ==
Hyperolius pseudargus inhabits open farmland, heavily degraded former forests (farm bush), and montane grasslands at elevations of 1,500–1,850 m (4,920–6,070 ft) above sea level. Breeding takes place in small pools and males call from sedges near water and from floating vegetation.

This species is common. Although its range is small, it is adaptable and is not facing significant threats. It might occur in the Udzungwa Mountains National Park.
