= Hyperolius bicolor =

Conservation status
- Data Deficient (IUCN 3.1)

Scientific classification
- Kingdom: Animalia
- Phylum: Chordata
- Class: Amphibia
- Order: Anura
- Family: Hyperoliidae
- Genus: Hyperolius
- Species: H. bicolor

Binomial name
- Hyperolius bicolor Ahl, 1931

Species of frog

Hyperolius bicolor is a species of frog in the family Hyperoliidae. It is endemic to Angola. Its natural habitats are rivers, freshwater marshes, and intermittent freshwater marshes.

Hyperolius bicolor is a species of reed frog, commonly known as the "tree frog." The typical diet consists of hydei fruit flies and crickets. They spend much of their time clinging to trees, able to grapple onto them using their sticky webbed feet.
