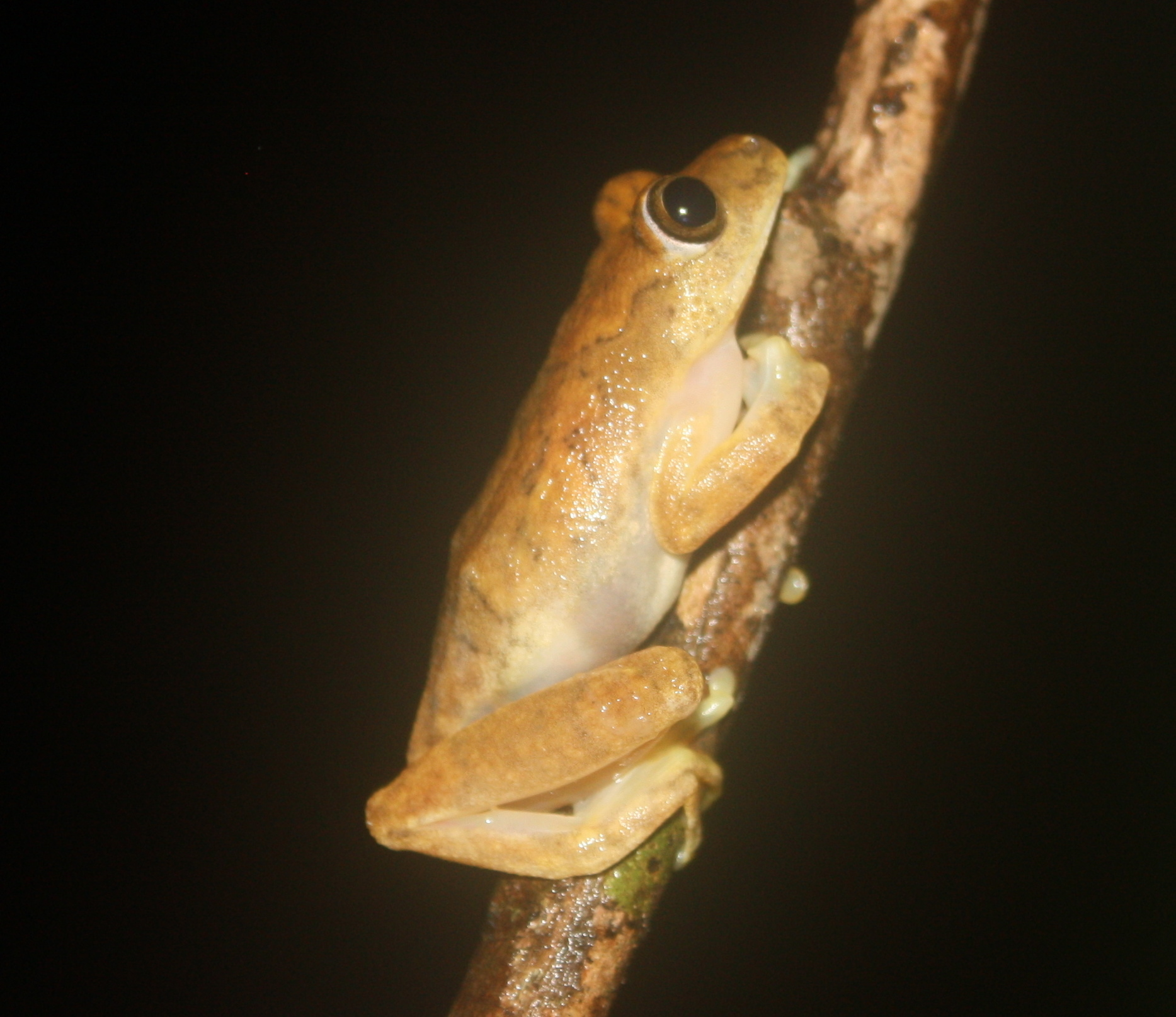

Conservation status
- Least Concern (IUCN 3.1)

Scientific classification
- Kingdom: Animalia
- Phylum: Chordata
- Class: Amphibia
- Order: Anura
- Family: Hyperoliidae
- Genus: Hyperolius
- Species: H. zonatus

Binomial name
- Hyperolius zonatus Laurent, 1958

= Hyperolius zonatus =

Species of frog

Hyperolius zonatus is a species of frog in the family Hyperoliidae. It is found in Ivory Coast, Guinea, Sierra Leone, and possibly Liberia. Its natural habitats are subtropical or tropical moist lowland forests, swamps, and intermittent freshwater marshes. It is threatened by habitat loss.
