= Hyperolius pyrrhodictyon =

Conservation status
- Least Concern (IUCN 3.1)

Scientific classification
- Kingdom: Animalia
- Phylum: Chordata
- Class: Amphibia
- Order: Anura
- Family: Hyperoliidae
- Genus: Hyperolius
- Species: H. pyrrhodictyon

Binomial name
- Hyperolius pyrrhodictyon Laurent, 1965

Species of frog

Hyperolius pyrrhodictyon is a species of frog in the family Hyperoliidae. It is endemic to Zambia. Its natural habitats are dry savanna, moist savanna, subtropical or tropical dry shrubland, subtropical or tropical moist shrubland, subtropical or tropical dry lowland grassland, subtropical or tropical seasonally wet or flooded lowland grassland, rivers, swamps, freshwater lakes, intermittent freshwater lakes, freshwater marshes, intermittent freshwater marshes, arable land, pastureland, urban areas, heavily degraded former forest, water storage areas, ponds, open excavations, irrigated land, seasonally flooded agricultural land, and canals and ditches.
