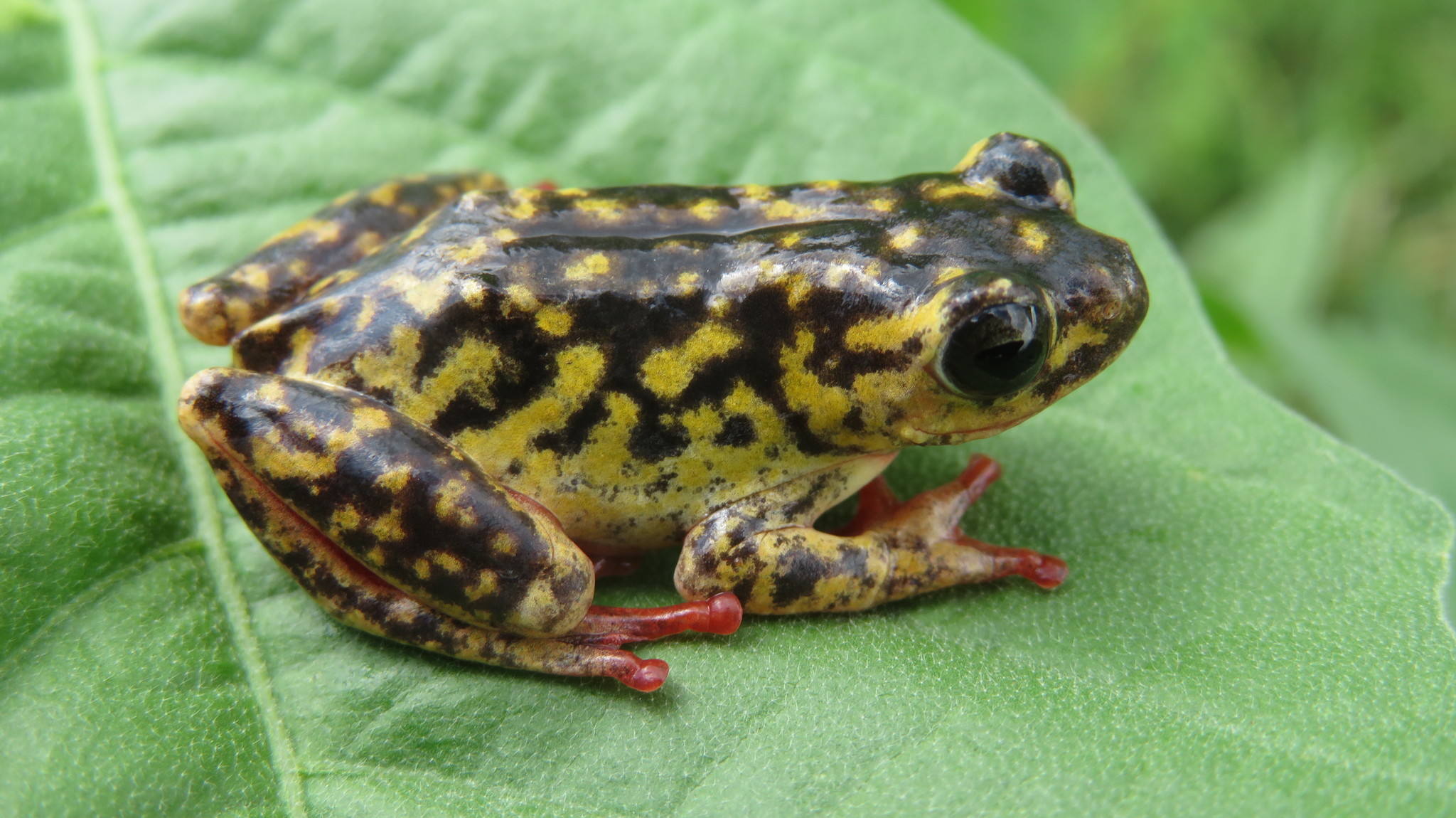

Conservation status
- Least Concern (IUCN 3.1)

Scientific classification
- Kingdom: Animalia
- Phylum: Chordata
- Class: Amphibia
- Order: Anura
- Family: Hyperoliidae
- Genus: Hyperolius
- Species: H. glandicolor

Binomial name
- Hyperolius glandicolor Peters, 1878

Synonyms
- Hyperolius striolatus Peters, 1882; Megalixalus pantherinus Steindachner, 1891; Rappia Ferniquei Mocquard, 1902; Rappia symetrica Mocquard, 1902; Rappia platyrhinus Procter, 1920; Hyperolius goetzei Ahl, 1931; Hyperolius coeruleopunctatus Ahl, 1931; Hyperolius scheffleri Ahl, 1931; Hyperolius pulchromarmoratus Ahl, 1931; Hyperolius albolabris Ahl, 1931; Hyperolius bergeri Ahl, 1931; Hyperolius marmoratus ommatostictus Laurent, 1951; Hyperolius viridiflavus ngorongoriensis Schiøtz, 1975; Hyperolius orkarkarri Drewes, 1997

= Hyperolius glandicolor =

Species of frog

Hyperolius glandicolor is a species of frog in the family Hyperoliidae. It is known from southern Somalia, Kenya, Tanzania, Rwanda, and Burundi. The limits of its distribution, however, are uncertain, and it might also occur in Malawi, Mozambique, Uganda, and even eastern Democratic Republic of the Congo. Common name Peters reed frog has been coined for it.

Hyperolius glandicolor occurs in emergent vegetation at swamp, river, and lake margins in all types of savanna, grassland, and bush land habitats, as well as in many anthropogenic habitats, such as cultivated land, towns, and gardens. It is able to rapidly colonize new bodies of water. Breeding takes usually place in temporary, but often also in permanent ponds, ranging from very small to very large ones. The eggs are deposited directly into the water. No threats to this very common and adaptable species are known. It occurs in many protected areas.
