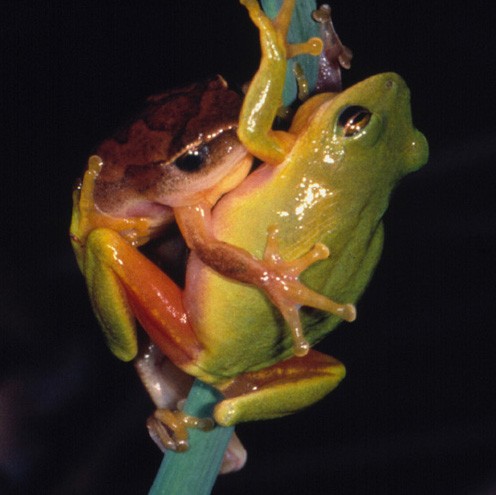

Conservation status
- Least Concern (IUCN 3.1)

Scientific classification
- Kingdom: Animalia
- Phylum: Chordata
- Class: Amphibia
- Order: Anura
- Family: Hyperoliidae
- Genus: Hyperolius
- Species: H. tuberilinguis

Binomial name
- Hyperolius tuberilinguis Smith, 1849

= Hyperolius tuberilinguis =

Species of amphibian

Hyperolius tuberilinguis (commonly known as tinker reed frog) is a species of frog in the family Hyperoliidae. It is found in Eswatini, Kenya, Malawi, Mozambique, South Africa, Tanzania, and Zimbabwe.

Its natural habitats are dry savanna, moist savanna, subtropical or tropical moist shrubland, subtropical or tropical dry lowland grassland, subtropical or tropical seasonally wet or flooded lowland grassland, rivers, swamps, freshwater lakes, intermittent freshwater lakes, freshwater marshes, intermittent freshwater marshes, arable land, pastureland, rural gardens, water storage areas, and ponds. It is not considered threatened by the IUCN.
