= Hyperolius atrigularis =

Conservation status
- Data Deficient (IUCN 3.1)

Scientific classification
- Kingdom: Animalia
- Phylum: Chordata
- Class: Amphibia
- Order: Anura
- Family: Hyperoliidae
- Genus: Hyperolius
- Species: H. atrigularis

Binomial name
- Hyperolius atrigularis Laurent, 1941

Species of frog

Hyperolius atrigularis is a species of frog in the family Hyperoliidae. It is endemic to Democratic Republic of the Congo. Its natural habitats are subtropical or tropical high-altitude grassland, swamps, and intermittent freshwater marshes.
