= Hyperolius maestus =

Conservation status
- Data Deficient (IUCN 3.1)

Scientific classification
- Kingdom: Animalia
- Phylum: Chordata
- Class: Amphibia
- Order: Anura
- Family: Hyperoliidae
- Genus: Hyperolius
- Species: H. maestus

Binomial name
- Hyperolius maestus Rochebrune, 1885

Species of amphibian

Hyperolius maestus is a species of frog of questionable status in the family Hyperoliidae. Described more than a century ago, it is only known from its type locality, Landana, in the Cabinda Province of northern Angola. The holotype was originally deposited in Museo Bouvier and—if it survives at all—now presumably lies unidentified in the National Museum of Natural History, France. Hyperolius maestus might be a synonym of Hyperolius marmoratus.

Common name Cabinda reed frog has been proposed for this species.
