= Hyperolius diaphanus =

Conservation status
- Data Deficient (IUCN 3.1)

Scientific classification
- Kingdom: Animalia
- Phylum: Chordata
- Class: Amphibia
- Order: Anura
- Family: Hyperoliidae
- Genus: Hyperolius
- Species: H. diaphanus

Binomial name
- Hyperolius diaphanus Laurent, 1972

Species of amphibian

Hyperolius diaphanus is a species of frog in the family Hyperoliidae. It is endemic to the eastern Democratic Republic of the Congo and is known from near the Itombwe Mountains and the mountains to the west of Lake Kivu. Limits of its range are not clear and might extend into the adjacent Burundi and Rwanda. Common names Kigulube reed frog and translucent reed frog have been proposed for this species.

== Description ==
Adult males measure 21–28 mm (0.8–1.1 in) and adult females 25–32 mm (1.0–1.3 in) in snout–vent length. The dorsum is greyish green while the ventrum is white. The "femur" and the extremities are bright yellow. There are two color morphs, known as phases linked, to development and sex: all newly metamorphosed individuals display phase "J" pattern, whereas all females, and some males, develop into phase "F" before the first breeding season. Phase "j" is normally brownish to green with paired light dorsolateral lines or an hourglass pattern. Phase "F" is often colorful and variable, showing the diagnostic color characteristics. In addition to the well-defined morphs, graded variation is also present.

H. diaphanus is very similar to Hyperolius frontalis but lacks the light triangle on the snout of the latter, has yellow rather than orange-red extremities, and is somewhat smaller.

== Habitat and conservation ==
Hyperolius diaphanus is believed to be an arboreal forest species. It is known from 900–1,000 m (3,000–3,300 ft) above sea level, suggesting that it is an intermediate-altitude species. Breeding presumably takes place in water. Threats to this poorly known species are unknown. It is not known to occur in any protected areas.
