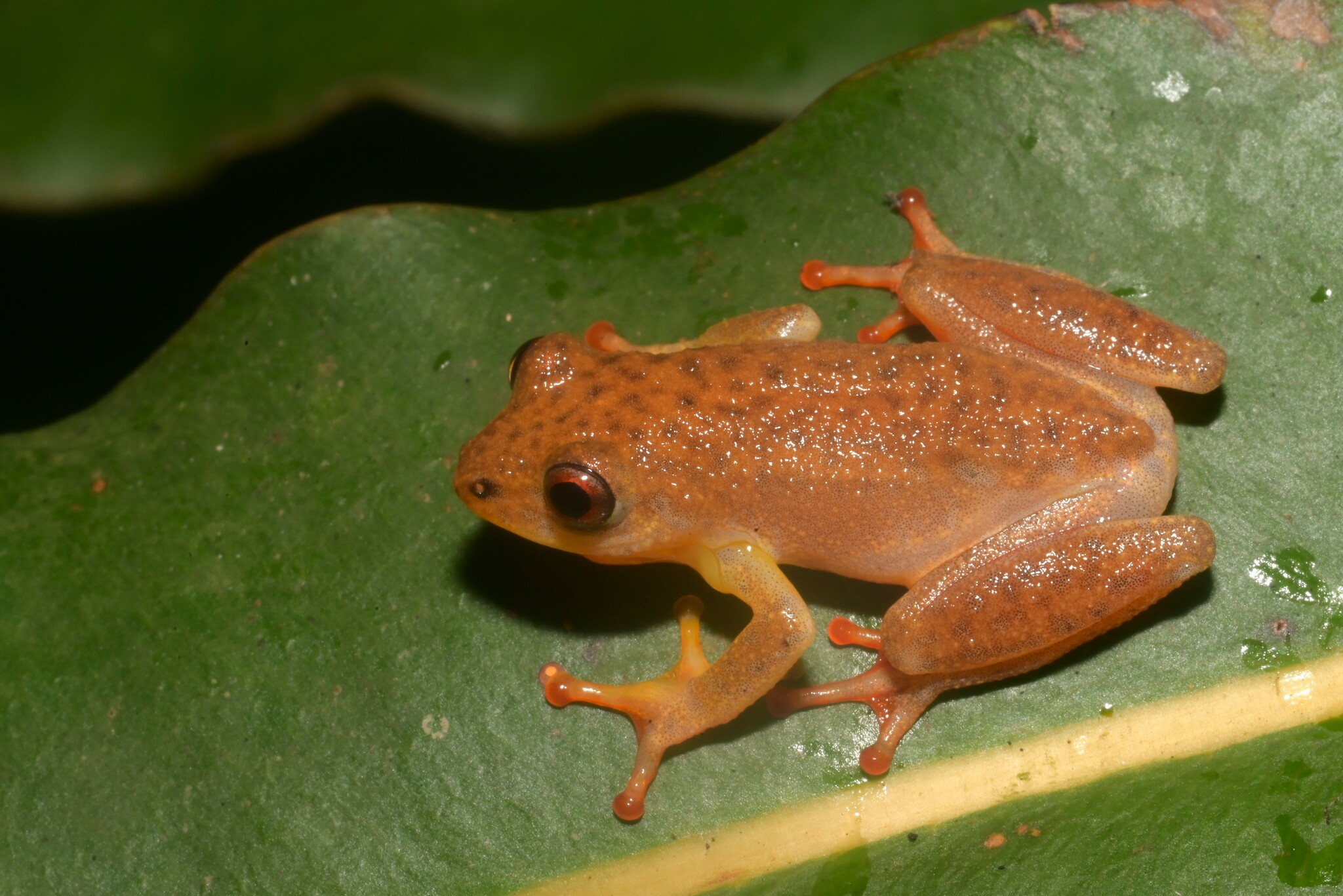

Conservation status
- Critically Endangered (IUCN 3.1)

Scientific classification
- Kingdom: Animalia
- Phylum: Chordata
- Class: Amphibia
- Order: Anura
- Family: Hyperoliidae
- Genus: Hyperolius
- Species: H. ruvuensis

Binomial name
- Hyperolius ruvuensis Barratt, Lawson & Loader, 2017

= Hyperolius ruvuensis =

Species of frog

Hyperolius ruvuensis (commonly known as the Ruvu reed frog) is a species of frog in the family Hyperoliidae from Sub-Saharan Africa. It is part of the spiny throated reed frog complex.

The genus is known to exhibit sexual dichromatism, a trait that is otherwise rare in frogs.

== Distribution ==
Hyperolius ruvuensis has been found only in the Ruvu South Forest Reserve in Tanzania.

== Conservation ==
The authors of the article in which Hyperolius ruvuensis is first described and the IUCN SSC Amphibian Specialist Group both consider the species to be "critically endangered".
