= Hyperolius polli =

Conservation status
- Data Deficient (IUCN 3.1)

Scientific classification
- Kingdom: Animalia
- Phylum: Chordata
- Class: Amphibia
- Order: Anura
- Family: Hyperoliidae
- Genus: Hyperolius
- Species: H. polli

Binomial name
- Hyperolius polli Laurent, 1943

Species of frog

Hyperolius polli, commonly known as the Tshimbulu reed frog, is a species of frog in the family Hyperoliidae.

It is known from only two locations – Tshimbulu sur Luebi in Kasai Province in the southwestern Democratic Republic of the Congo, and Rio Chingufo in northeastern Angola. Its natural habitats are rivers, swamps, freshwater marshes, and intermittent freshwater marshes.
