= Hyperolius major =

Conservation status
- Least Concern (IUCN 3.1)

Scientific classification
- Kingdom: Animalia
- Phylum: Chordata
- Class: Amphibia
- Order: Anura
- Family: Hyperoliidae
- Genus: Hyperolius
- Species: H. major

Binomial name
- Hyperolius major Laurent, 1957

Species of frog

Hyperolius major is a species of frog in the family Hyperoliidae. It is found in Democratic Republic of the Congo, Zambia, and possibly Angola. Its natural habitats are subtropical or tropical dry forests, moist savanna, rivers, and swamps.
