= Hyperolius houyi =

Conservation status
- Data Deficient (IUCN 3.1)

Scientific classification
- Kingdom: Animalia
- Phylum: Chordata
- Class: Amphibia
- Order: Anura
- Family: Hyperoliidae
- Genus: Hyperolius
- Species: H. houyi

Binomial name
- Hyperolius houyi Ahl, 1931

Species of amphibian

Hyperolius houyi is a species of frog in the family Hyperoliidae. It is only known from its type locality, "Ussagara, Neu Kamerum", which some sources consider untraceable but place in the modern-day Chad, while others associate it with Ussagara in Tanzania instead. Common name Ussagara reed frog has been coined for this species.

== Etymology ==
The specific name houyi honours Dr Reinhard Houy who collected in Tanzania in 1911–1912.

== Taxonomy ==
The taxonomic status of Hyperolius houyi is unclear. The holotype is lost. It is probably a synonym of Hyperolius viridiflavus (superspecies).

== Habitat and conservation ==
Hyperolius houyi probably breeds in bodies of water. Threats to this poorly known species are unknown.
