= Hyperolius nimbae =

Conservation status
- Endangered (IUCN 3.1)

Scientific classification
- Kingdom: Animalia
- Phylum: Chordata
- Class: Amphibia
- Order: Anura
- Family: Hyperoliidae
- Genus: Hyperolius
- Species: H. nimbae

Binomial name
- Hyperolius nimbae Laurent, 1958

Species of amphibian

Hyperolius nimbae, the Mount Nimba reed frog, is a species of frog in the family Hyperoliidae. It is found in Ivory Coast, possibly Guinea, and possibly Liberia. Its natural habitats are subtropical or tropical moist lowland forests, swamps, and heavily degraded former forest. It is threatened by habitat loss.

In 2010, this species was observed for the first time since 1967.
