= Hyperolius cystocandicans =

Tigoni reed frog

Conservation status
- Endangered (IUCN 3.1)

Scientific classification
- Kingdom: Animalia
- Phylum: Chordata
- Class: Amphibia
- Order: Anura
- Family: Hyperoliidae
- Genus: Hyperolius
- Species: H. cystocandicans

Binomial name
- Hyperolius cystocandicans Richards & Schiøtz, 1977

Species of frog

The tigoni reed frog (Hyperolius cystocandicans) is a species of frog in the family Hyperoliidae. It is endemic to Kenya. Its natural habitats are subtropical or tropical dry lowland grassland, freshwater marshes, intermittent freshwater marshes, arable land, pastureland, and ponds. It is threatened by habitat loss.

== Sources ==
- C. Michael Hogan. 2013. Hyperolius cystocandicans. J.African Amphibians. ed. B.Zimkus
