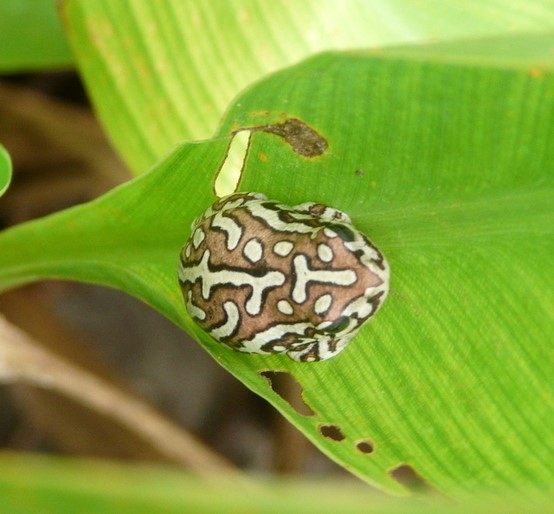

Conservation status
- Least Concern (IUCN 3.1)

Scientific classification
- Kingdom: Animalia
- Phylum: Chordata
- Class: Amphibia
- Order: Anura
- Family: Hyperoliidae
- Genus: Hyperolius
- Species: H. parallelus

Binomial name
- Hyperolius parallelus Günther, 1858

Synonyms
- Hyperolius marmoratus var. angolensis Steindachner, 1867; Hyperolius angolensis Steindachner, 1867; Hyperolius toulsonii Bocage, 1868 "1867"; Hyperolius insignis Bocage, 1868 "1867"; Hyperolius huillensis Bocage, 1873; Hyperolius erythromelanus Monard, 1937 "1936"; Hyperolius angolensis quarrei Laurent, 1943

= Hyperolius parallelus =

Species of frog

Hyperolius parallelus, also known as the Angolan reed frog (being treated as Hyperolius angolensis by many authors), is a species of frog in the family Hyperoliidae. It is found in Southern and Central Africa. It is part of the so-called Hyperolius viridiflavus species complex and has a complex history of taxonomic treatments.

== Description ==
In samples from Central Africa, adult males measure 30–38 mm (1.2–1.5 in) in snout–vent length. The tympanum is not visible. The head and snout are short. The syntypes were dorsally dark brown with three white, parallel bands; nevertheless, the dorsal pattern is variable.

== Distribution and habitat ==
Hyperolius parallelus is found in southern Republic of the Congo and Democratic Republic of the Congo, Angola, northern Namibia and Botswana, and western Zambia; the exact limits of its range are not clear and might extend into Gabon and Zimbabwe. It occurs in savanna, grassland and bush land, as well as many human-modified habitats such as cultivated land, towns, and gardens; it is associated in with emergent vegetation at the margins of swamps, rivers and lakes. Reproduction takes place in both temporary and permanent bodies of water and the eggs are laid directly into the water.

== Conservation ==
This widespread and extremely abundant species is not facing any significant threats; it readily colonizes newly created waterbodies. It probably is present in many protected areas.
