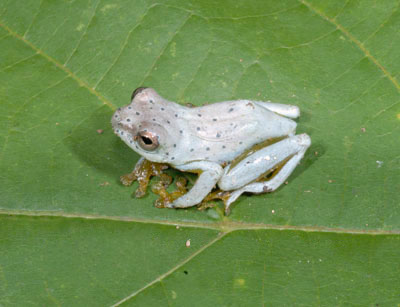

Conservation status
- Least Concern (IUCN 3.1)

Scientific classification
- Kingdom: Animalia
- Phylum: Chordata
- Class: Amphibia
- Order: Anura
- Family: Hyperoliidae
- Genus: Hyperolius
- Species: H. ocellatus

Binomial name
- Hyperolius ocellatus Günther, 1858

= Hyperolius ocellatus =

Species of amphibian

Hyperolius ocellatus is a species of tropical West African frog in the family Hyperoliidae, that is split into the subspecies H. o. ocellatus and H. o. purpurescens. It is found in Angola, Cameroon, Central African Republic, Republic of the Congo, Democratic Republic of the Congo, Equatorial Guinea, Gabon, Nigeria, Uganda, and possibly Rwanda. Its natural habitats are subtropical or tropical moist lowland forests, rivers, intermittent freshwater marshes, freshwater springs, rural gardens, heavily degraded former forest, ponds, and canals and ditches.

== Distribution and habitat ==
Hyperolius ocellatus ocellatus is from areas west of the Sanaga River in Cameroon, and H. o. purpurescens is found south and east of the river. Due to the high population of the species and the extended area in which it can be found, the International Union for Conservation of Nature have classed Hyperolius ocellatus as Least Concern, as its population is thought to be stable. It is unlikely that the population is declining fast enough for the species to be classed as threatened. At the highest elevations, it is found at 2,000 metres (6,600 feet) above sea level.

== Description ==
The species is one of the smallest in the genus Hyperolius, with females being the larger gender at 23 to 34 millimetres (0.91 to 1.34 inches) and males being 20 to 27 millimetres (0.79 to 1.06 in). The abdomen is yellow. Juveniles are green with a faint triangle on their snout with silver stripes, and mature females along with some mature males are silver-grey with black spots. Mature females and juveniles show a reddish ground colour. H. o. ocellatus specimens are sometimes silver-grey with a yellow ventrum and small black spots, and females have small unocellated spots. H. o. purpurescens male specimens have dorsolateral lines, and a faint triangle on their snout. Females have fewer spots and are larger, green-blue in colour, and have no spots on their ventrum. The frogs breed in small forest swamps, small pools and streams. It is found in freshwater and terrestrial systems, and in many protected areas.

== Taxonomy ==
It was first described by Albert Günther in 1858, and synonyms include Hyperolius guttatus, Rappia ocellata, Rappia guttata, among others.
