= Hyperolius obscurus =

Conservation status
- Data Deficient (IUCN 3.1)

Scientific classification
- Kingdom: Animalia
- Phylum: Chordata
- Class: Amphibia
- Order: Anura
- Family: Hyperoliidae
- Genus: Hyperolius
- Species: H. obscurus

Binomial name
- Hyperolius obscurus Laurent, 1943

Species of frog

Hyperolius obscurus is a species of frog in the family Hyperoliidae. It is a poorly known species known only from its holotype collected from Sandoa, in Kasai Province, south-western Democratic Republic of the Congo, near the border with Angola. Common name Kasai reed frog has been proposed for it.

== Description ==
The holotype is a female measuring 25 mm (1.0 in) in snout–vent length. The head is rather large and broad, with blunt snout. The body is slender. The dorsum is uniform brown. The flanks, ventrum, and limbs have fine dark punctuation.

== Habitat and conservation ==
Hyperolius obscurus is a very poorly known species, with no information on its habitat, ecology, or population status. Threats to it are unknown. It is not known to occur in any protected areas.
