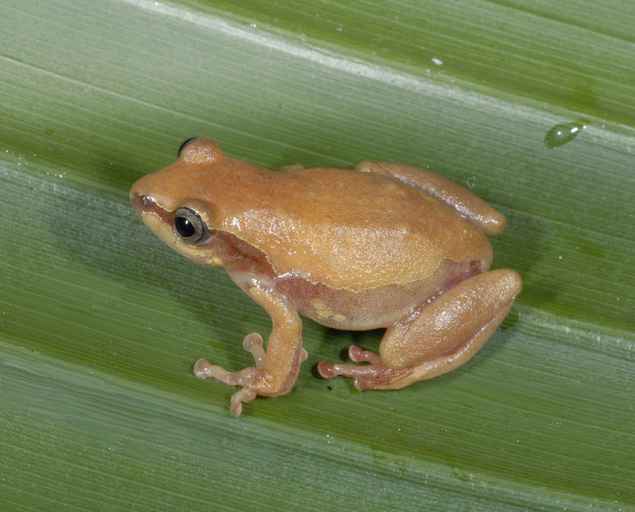

Conservation status
- Least Concern (IUCN 3.1)

Scientific classification
- Kingdom: Animalia
- Phylum: Chordata
- Class: Amphibia
- Order: Anura
- Family: Hyperoliidae
- Genus: Hyperolius
- Species: H. castaneus

Binomial name
- Hyperolius castaneus Ahl, 1931

Synonyms
- Hyperolius latifrons Ahl, 1931; Hyperolius rugegensis Ahl, 1931; Hyperolius ventrimaculatus Ahl, 1931; Hyperolius rugegensis Ahl, 1931; Hyperolius adolphi-friederici Ahl, 1931; Hyperolius castaneus rhodogaster Laurent, 1951

= Hyperolius castaneus =

Species of amphibian

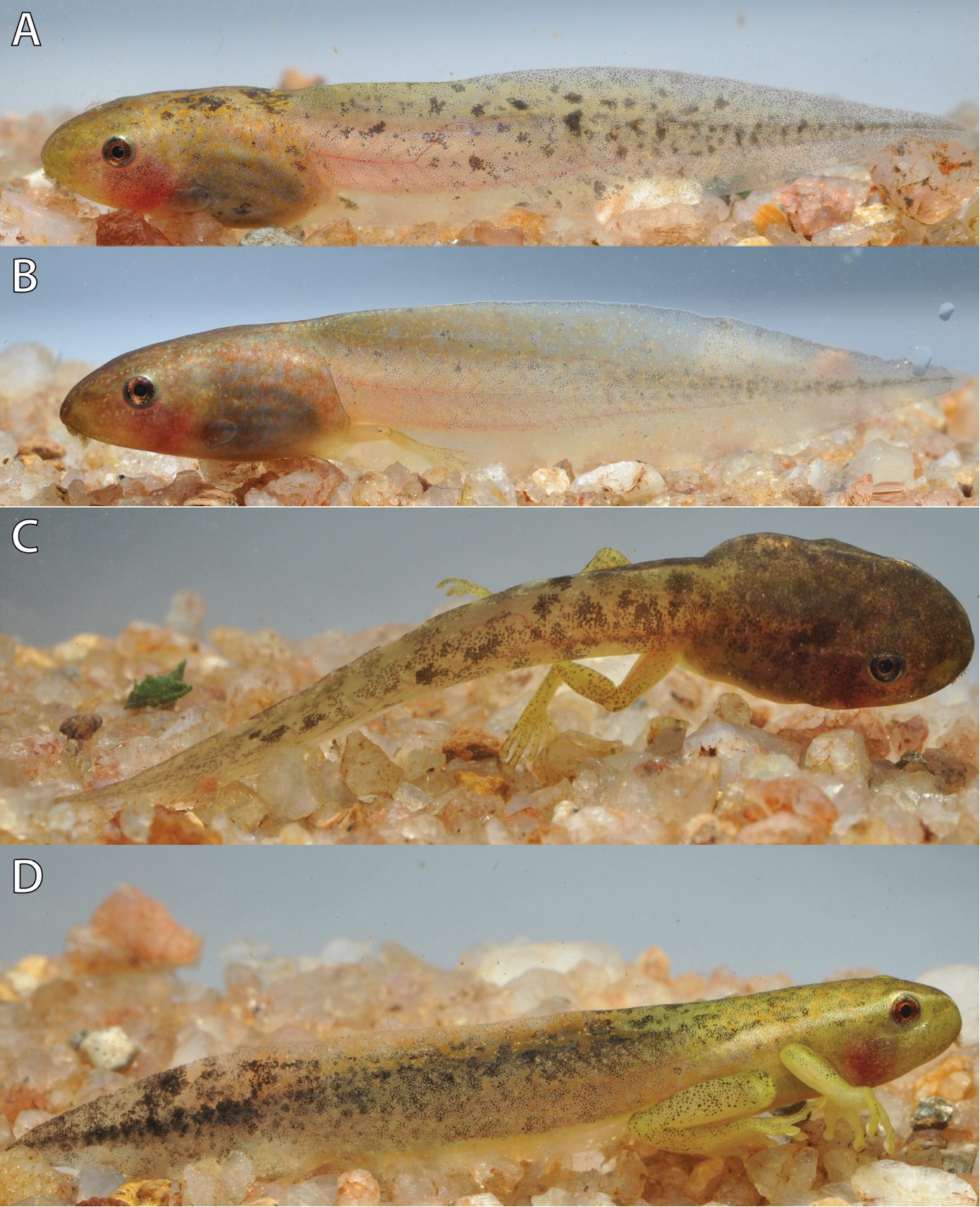
Tadpoles of H. castaneus

Hyperolius castaneus is a species of frogs in the family Hyperoliidae. It is found in the highlands of western Burundi, Rwanda, and Uganda as well as eastern Democratic Republic of the Congo. Common names of this species include Ahl's reed frog, brown reed frog, and montane reed frog. The status of the putative subspecies Hyperolius castaneus rhodogaster is unclear, and it may actually be a distinct species. Also Hyperolius constellatus, now a distinct species, was formerly recognized as a subspecies of H. castaneus.

== Description ==
Adult males measure 20–26 mm (0.79–1.02 in) and adult females 27–32 mm (1.1–1.3 in) in snout–vent length. The color pattern is highly variable. The dorsum in adult males is consistently tan to brown. There are varying levels of yellow or brown spots, or yellow blotches that may cover most of the dorsum. The yellow spots might have dark brown centers or edging. Most specimens have a brown or dark brown canthal stripe that runs from the nostril through the eye to at least the forelimb insertion, sometimes further to the inguinal region of the hind limb. The throat is canary yellow. The belly is grayish blue or white. The limbs are salmon red to red, with the concealed parts of the thighs being bright orangish red. In adult females, the dorsal ground color varies from orangish brown to mustard yellow. The canthal region is dark brown in most individuals, and that coloration may extend from the posterior of the orbit to the forelimb insertion. The dorsum may be completely without patterns, or the patterns can resemble the males ones, or may include large brown blotches with neon yellowish green borders. The abdomen is white with a light pink to grayish blue throat; the limbs have similar color. The hands and feet may be salmon red. In both males and females, the flanks and dorsum may have a lighter brown coloration than the remainder of the dorsum, or range from light gray to salmon red. Juveniles and subadults have coloring that transitions from a lime green dorsum (often with a white dorsolateral line) to the adult coloration described above.

== Habitat and conservation ==
Hyperolius castaneus occurs in swamps in montane grassland and forest at elevations of 1,600–2,850 m (5,250–9,350 ft) above sea level.

== Conservation ==
First assessed as "vulnerable" in 2004, this species is now listed as "least concern" due to the discovery that it occurs more widely than previously thought (now a 73,498 km² estimated extent of occurrence) and because, despite ongoing habitat loss, there is currently an abundance of suitable habitats within its range. It is considered to be an abundant species. It is present in several national parks.
