= Hyperolius mariae =

Conservation status
- Least Concern (IUCN 3.1)

Scientific classification
- Kingdom: Animalia
- Phylum: Chordata
- Class: Amphibia
- Order: Anura
- Family: Hyperoliidae
- Genus: Hyperolius
- Species: H. mariae

Binomial name
- Hyperolius mariae Barbour & Loveridge, 1928

Species of frog

Hyperolius mariae is a species of frog in the family Hyperoliidae.

It is found in Democratic Republic of the Congo, Kenya, Tanzania, and Zambia.

Its natural habitats are dry savanna, moist savanna, subtropical or tropical dry shrubland, subtropical or tropical moist shrubland, subtropical or tropical dry lowland grassland, subtropical or tropical seasonally wet or flooded lowland grassland, rivers, swamps, freshwater lakes, intermittent freshwater lakes, freshwater marshes, intermittent freshwater marshes, arable land, pastureland, rural gardens, urban areas, water storage areas, ponds, open excavations, irrigated land, seasonally flooded agricultural land, and canals and ditches.
