= Hyperolius lucani =

Conservation status
- Data Deficient (IUCN 3.1)

Scientific classification
- Kingdom: Animalia
- Phylum: Chordata
- Class: Amphibia
- Order: Anura
- Family: Hyperoliidae
- Genus: Hyperolius
- Species: H. lucani

Binomial name
- Hyperolius lucani Rochebrune, 1885

Species of frog

Hyperolius lucani is a species of frog in the family Hyperoliidae. It is endemic to Angola. Its natural habitats are rivers, freshwater marshes, and intermittent freshwater marshes.
