= Hyperolius leleupi =

Conservation status
- Endangered (IUCN 3.1)

Scientific classification
- Kingdom: Animalia
- Phylum: Chordata
- Class: Amphibia
- Order: Anura
- Family: Hyperoliidae
- Genus: Hyperolius
- Species: H. leleupi

Binomial name
- Hyperolius leleupi Laurent, 1951

Species of frog

Hyperolius leleupi is a species of frog in the family Hyperoliidae. It is endemic to the Itombwe Mountains in the eastern Democratic Republic of the Congo. This little-known but likely rare species occurs in high-altitude bamboo forests at around 2,550 m (8,370 ft) above sea level. Habitat loss caused by agriculture, livestock and human settlements is likely a threat.
