= Hyperolius kachalolae =

Conservation status
- Least Concern (IUCN 3.1)

Scientific classification
- Kingdom: Animalia
- Phylum: Chordata
- Class: Amphibia
- Order: Anura
- Family: Hyperoliidae
- Genus: Hyperolius
- Species: H. kachalolae

Binomial name
- Hyperolius kachalolae Schiøtz, 1975

Species of frog

Hyperolius kachalolae is a species of frog in the family Hyperoliidae. It is known from the area extending from northwestern Zambia to central Malawi, although it is likely that its true range extends into adjacent southern Democratic Republic of the Congo and extreme eastern Angola. Common name Kachalola reed frog has been proposed for it.

== Description ==
Males and females grow to 29 mm (1.1 in) in snout–vent length. The body is robust. The toes are mostly webbed (the fourth toe has 1½ phalanges free). Females are tomato-red, while males are yellow, brown, or green; a thin, red line runs along the side of snout, over the eye, and continues backwards as a dorsolateral band. Both males and females have red digital discs and webbing. The underside is white. Breeding males have a turquoise throat.

The male advertisement call is a short, nasal whistle.

== Habitat and conservation ==
Hyperolius kachalolae inhabits rather humid, dense (wooded) savanna. Breeding takes place in temporary pools and marshes, and possibly also permanent pools. Males call from trees and grass stems.

While there have not been many records of this species, it is believed to be common. It lives in areas with little human impact, probably tolerates some habitat alteration, and is unlikely to face significant threats. It is likely present in several protected areas.
