= Hyperolius cinereus =

Conservation status
- Least Concern (IUCN 3.1)

Scientific classification
- Kingdom: Animalia
- Phylum: Chordata
- Class: Amphibia
- Order: Anura
- Family: Hyperoliidae
- Genus: Hyperolius
- Species: H. cinereus

Binomial name
- Hyperolius cinereus Monard, 1937

Species of amphibian

Hyperolius cinereus, Monard's reed frog or ashy reed frog, is a species of frog in the family Hyperoliidae. It is found in Angola and possibly Democratic Republic of the Congo. Its natural habitats are rivers, swamps, freshwater marshes, and intermittent freshwater marshes.
