= Hyperolius kihangensis =

Conservation status
- Endangered (IUCN 3.1)

Scientific classification
- Kingdom: Animalia
- Phylum: Chordata
- Class: Amphibia
- Order: Anura
- Family: Hyperoliidae
- Genus: Hyperolius
- Species: H. kihangensis

Binomial name
- Hyperolius kihangensis Schiøtz and Westergaard, 1999
- Hyperolius kihangensis is only known from the Udzungwa Mountains in Tanzania

Species of amphibian

Hyperolius kihangensis, also known as the Kihanga reed frog or volcano reed frog, is a species of frogs in the family Hyperoliidae. It is endemic to the Udzungwa Mountains in south-central Tanzania.

== Description ==
Adult males measure 16–19 mm (0.6–0.7 in) and adult females 23–26 mm (0.9–1.0 in) in snout–vent length. The body and head are broad and flat. The eyes are large and protruding. The snout is short. Webbing between the toes is reduced. The dorsum is mottled brown and gray with small dark spots. A broad light band runs across the lower back. The heels have a small white dot each. Some individuals have an hourglass pattern on the dorsum. Toes and fingers are yellowish to reddish. The ventral surface is yellow in males and reddish in females. Males have a well-developed vocal sac that is white.

The male advertisement call is a series of quiet clicks – initially, this species was suspected even to be mute.

== Habitat and conservation ==
Hyperolius kihangensis inhabits swamps in dense montane forests at elevations above 1,700 m (5,600 ft). The type series was collected in a dense, swampy forest with shallow, stagnant water, and with the ground was almost completely covered by grass tufts. The eggs are deposited close to the water on leaves.

This species is relatively common within its small range. It is threatened by habitat loss caused by agricultural encroachment and small-scale wood extraction. It is present in the Udzungwa Scarp Forest Reserve, which was expected (as of 2015) to become a nature reserve, improving protection of the habitat.
