= Hyperolius acuticephalus =

Conservation status
- Data Deficient (IUCN 3.1)

Scientific classification
- Kingdom: Animalia
- Phylum: Chordata
- Class: Amphibia
- Order: Anura
- Family: Hyperoliidae
- Genus: Hyperolius
- Species: H. acuticephalus

Binomial name
- Hyperolius acuticephalus Ahl, 1931

Species of frog

Hyperolius acuticephalus is a species of frog in the family Hyperoliidae. Being only known from its type locality, Ngoto in southwestern Central African Republic, it is endemic to that country. However, the exact type locality is considered untraceable. There are doubts about taxonomic validity of this species, to the degree that the AmphibiaWeb considers it a nomen nudum.

There is no information on ecology of or threats to this species.
