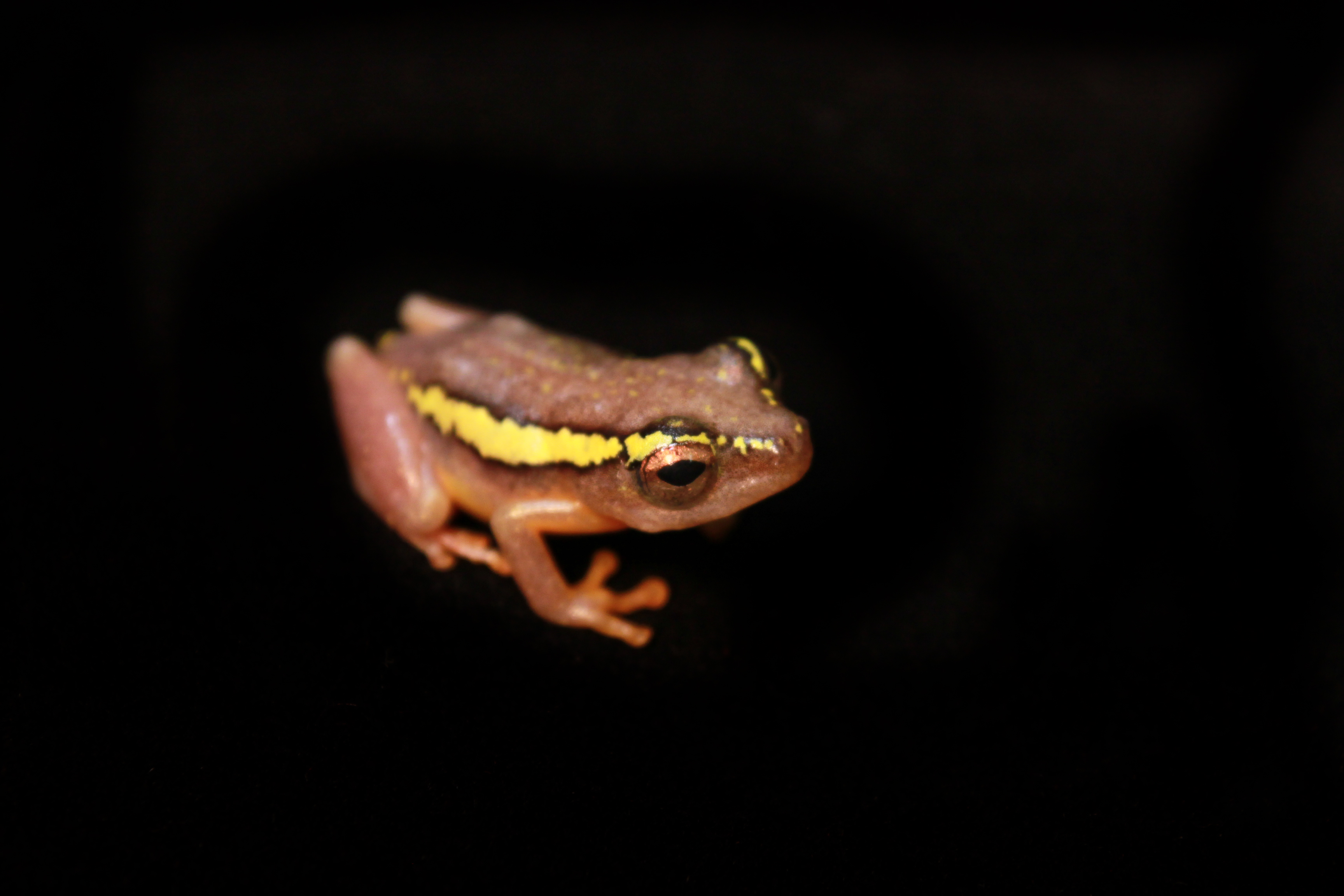

Conservation status
- Least Concern (IUCN 3.1)

Scientific classification
- Kingdom: Animalia
- Phylum: Chordata
- Class: Amphibia
- Order: Anura
- Family: Hyperoliidae
- Genus: Hyperolius
- Species: H. platyceps

Binomial name
- Hyperolius platyceps (Boulenger, 1900)

Synonyms
- Hyperolius angolanus Ahl, 1931

= Hyperolius platyceps =

Species of frog

Hyperolius platyceps is a species of frog in the family Hyperoliidae. It is found in Angola, Cameroon, Central African Republic, Republic of the Congo, Democratic Republic of the Congo, Equatorial Guinea, and Gabon. Its natural habitats are subtropical or tropical moist lowland forests, subtropical or tropical swamps, rivers, shrub-dominated wetlands, swamps, freshwater marshes, intermittent freshwater marshes, rural gardens, heavily degraded former forest, and ponds.
