= Hyperolius ghesquieri =

Conservation status
- Data Deficient (IUCN 3.1)

Scientific classification
- Kingdom: Animalia
- Phylum: Chordata
- Class: Amphibia
- Order: Anura
- Family: Hyperoliidae
- Genus: Hyperolius
- Species: H. ghesquieri

Binomial name
- Hyperolius ghesquieri Laurent, 1943

Species of frog

Hyperolius ghesquieri is a species of frog in the family Hyperoliidae. It is endemic to Democratic Republic of the Congo. Its natural habitats are subtropical or tropical moist lowland forests, rivers, swamps, freshwater marshes, and intermittent freshwater marshes.
