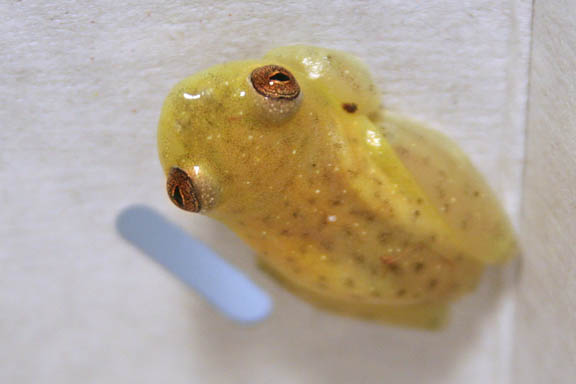
- Hyperolius argus

Scientific classification
- Kingdom: Animalia
- Phylum: Chordata
- Class: Amphibia
- Order: Anura
- Family: Hyperoliidae
- Genus: Hyperolius; Rapp, 1842

Type species
- Hyla horstocki Schlegel, 1837

Species
- 145 species (but see text)

Synonyms
- Eucnemis Tschudi, 1838 – homonym of Eucnemis Ahrens, 1812 (Insecta); Hyperolius Rapp, 1842 – replacement name; Epipole Gistel, 1848; Crumenifera Cope, 1862; Rappia Günther, 1865; Nesionixalus Perret, 1976; Chlorolius Perret, 1988; Alexteroon Perret, 1988

= Hyperolius =

Genus of frogs

Hyperolius (commonly known as the African reed frogs or reed frogs) is a large genus of frogs in the family Hyperoliidae from Sub-Saharan Africa. The genus is known to exhibit sexual dichromatism, a trait that is otherwise rare in frogs.

== Species ==
Different sources may delimit species differently, and as new species are still being described, different number of species can be found. As of March 2026, Amphibian Species of the World lists 145 species and AmphibiaWeb 155 species. The following list follows the Amphibian Species of the World:

- Hyperolius acuticephalus Ahl, 1931
- Hyperolius acutirostris Buchholz and Peters, 1875
- Hyperolius ademetzi Ahl, 1931
- Hyperolius adspersus Peters, 1877
- Hyperolius albofrenatus Ahl, 1931
- Hyperolius argus Peters, 1854
- Hyperolius atrigularis Laurent, 1941
- Hyperolius balfouri (Werner, 1908)
- Hyperolius baumanni Ahl, 1931
- Hyperolius benguellensis (Bocage, 1893)
- Hyperolius bicolor Ahl, 1931
- Hyperolius bobirensis Schiøtz, 1967
- Hyperolius bocagei Steindachner, 1867
- Hyperolius bolifambae Mertens, 1938
- Hyperolius bopeleti Amiet, 1980
- Hyperolius brachiofasciatus Ahl, 1931
- Hyperolius burgessi Loader, Lawson, Portik, and Menegon, 2015
- Hyperolius camerunensis Amiet, 2004
- Hyperolius castaneus Ahl, 1931
- Hyperolius chelaensis Conradie, Branch, Measey, and Tolley, 2012
- Hyperolius chlorosteus (Boulenger, 1915)
- Hyperolius chrysogaster Laurent, 1950
- Hyperolius cinereus Monard, 1937
- Hyperolius cinnamomeoventris Bocage, 1866
- Hyperolius concolor (Hallowell, 1844)
- Hyperolius constellatus Laurent, 1951
- Hyperolius cystocandicans Richards and Schiøtz, 1977
- Hyperolius dartevellei Laurent, 1943
- Hyperolius davenporti Loader, Lawson, Portik, and Menegon, 2015
- Hyperolius diaphanus Laurent, 1972
- Hyperolius dintelmanni Lötters and Schmitz, 2004
- Hyperolius discodactylus Ahl, 1931
- Hyperolius drewesi Bell, 2016
- Hyperolius endjami Amiet, 1980
- Hyperolius ferrugineus Laurent, 1943
- Hyperolius friedemanni Mercurio and Rödel in Channing, Hillers, Lötters, Rödel, Schick, Conradie, Rödder, Mercurio, Wagner, Dehling, Du Preez, Kielgast, and Burger, 2013
- Hyperolius frontalis Laurent, 1950
- Hyperolius fuscigula Bocage, 1866
- Hyperolius fusciventris Peters, 1876
- Hyperolius ghesquieri Laurent, 1943
- Hyperolius glandicolor Peters, 1878
- Hyperolius gularis Ahl, 1931
- Hyperolius guttulatus Günther, 1858
- Hyperolius horstockii (Schlegel, 1837)
- Hyperolius houyi Ahl, 1931
- Hyperolius howelli Du Preez and Channing in Channing, Hillers, Lötters, Rödel, Schick, Conradie, Rödder, Mercurio, Wagner, Dehling, Du Preez, Kielgast, and Burger, 2013
- Hyperolius hutsebauti Laurent, 1956
- Hyperolius hypsiphonus (Amiet, 2000)
- Hyperolius igbettensis Schiøtz, 1963
- Hyperolius inornatus Laurent, 1943
- Hyperolius inyangae Channing in Channing, Hillers, Lötters, Rödel, Schick, Conradie, Rödder, Mercurio, Wagner, Dehling, Du Preez, Kielgast, and Burger, 2013
- Hyperolius jackie Dehling, 2012
- Hyperolius jacobseni Channing in Channing, Hillers, Lötters, Rödel, Schick, Conradie, Rödder, Mercurio, Wagner, Dehling, Du Preez, Kielgast, and Burger, 2013
- Hyperolius jynx (Amiet, 2000)
- Hyperolius kachalolae Schiøtz, 1975
- Hyperolius kibarae Laurent, 1957
- Hyperolius kihangensis Schiøtz and Westergaard, 1999
- Hyperolius kivuensis Ahl, 1931
- Hyperolius koehleri Mertens, 1940
- Hyperolius kuligae Mertens, 1940
- Hyperolius lamottei Laurent, 1958
- Hyperolius langi Noble, 1924
- Hyperolius lateralis Laurent, 1940
- Hyperolius laurenti Schiøtz, 1967
- Hyperolius leleupi Laurent, 1951
- Hyperolius leucotaenius Laurent, 1950
- Hyperolius lucani Rochebrune, 1885
- Hyperolius lupiroensis Channing in Channing, Hillers, Lötters, Rödel, Schick, Conradie, Rödder, Mercurio, Wagner, Dehling, Du Preez, Kielgast, and Burger, 2013
- Hyperolius maestus Rochebrune, 1885
- Hyperolius major Laurent, 1957
- Hyperolius marginatus Peters, 1854
- Hyperolius mariae Barbour and Loveridge, 1928
- Hyperolius marmoratus Rapp, 1842
- Hyperolius microps Günther, 1864
- Hyperolius minutissimus Schiøtz, 1975
- Hyperolius mitchelli Loveridge, 1953
- Hyperolius molleri (Bedriaga, 1892)
- Hyperolius montanus (Angel, 1924)
- Hyperolius mosaicus Perret, 1959
- Hyperolius nasicus Laurent, 1943
- Hyperolius nasutus Günther, 1865
- Hyperolius nienokouensis Rödel, 1998
- Hyperolius nimbae Laurent, 1958
- Hyperolius nitidulus Peters, 1875
- Hyperolius obscurus Laurent, 1943
- Hyperolius obstetricans (Ahl, 1931)
- Hyperolius occidentalis Schiøtz, 1967
- Hyperolius ocellatus Günther, 1858
- Hyperolius olivaceus Buchholz and Peters, 1876
- Hyperolius papyri (Werner, 1908 "1907")
- Hyperolius parallelus Günther, 1858
- Hyperolius pardalis Laurent, 1948
- Hyperolius parkeri Loveridge, 1933
- Hyperolius phantasticus (Boulenger, 1899)
- Hyperolius pickersgilli Raw, 1982
- Hyperolius picturatus Peters, 1875
- Hyperolius pictus Ahl, 1931
- Hyperolius platyceps (Boulenger, 1900)
- Hyperolius polli Laurent, 1943
- Hyperolius polystictus Laurent, 1943
- Hyperolius poweri Loveridge, 1938
- Hyperolius protchei Rochebrune, 1885
- Hyperolius pseudargus Schiøtz and Westergaard, 1999
- Hyperolius puncticulatus (Pfeffer, 1893)
- Hyperolius pusillus (Cope, 1862)
- Hyperolius pustulifer Laurent, 1940
- Hyperolius pyrrhodictyon Laurent, 1965
- Hyperolius quadratomaculatus Ahl, 1931
- Hyperolius quinquevittatus Bocage, 1866
- Hyperolius raymondi Conradie, Branch, and Tolley, 2013
- Hyperolius rhizophilus Rochebrune, 1885
- Hyperolius rhodesianus Laurent, 1948
- Hyperolius riggenbachi (Nieden, 1910)
- Hyperolius rubrovermiculatus Schiøtz, 1975
- Hyperolius ruvuensis Barratt, Lawson and Loader, 2017
- Hyperolius rwandae Dehling, Sinsch, Rodel, and Channing in Channing, Hillers, Lötters, Rödel, Schick, Conradie, Rödder, Mercurio, Wagner, Dehling, Du Preez, Kielgast, and Burger, 2013
- Hyperolius sankuruensis Laurent, 1979
- Hyperolius schoutedeni Laurent, 1943
- Hyperolius semidiscus Hewitt, 1927
- Hyperolius sheldricki Duff-MacKay and Schiøtz, 1971
- Hyperolius soror (Chabanaud, 1921)
- Hyperolius spatzi Ahl, 1931
- Hyperolius spinigularis Stevens, 1971
- Hyperolius steindachneri Bocage, 1866
- Hyperolius stenodactylus Ahl, 1931
- Hyperolius stictus Conradie, Verburgt, Portik, Ohler, Bwong, and Lawson, 2018
- Hyperolius substriatus Ahl, 1931
- Hyperolius swynnertoni FitzSimons, 1941
- Hyperolius sylvaticus Schiøtz, 1967
- Hyperolius tanneri Schiøtz, 1982
- Hyperolius thomensis Bocage, 1886
- Hyperolius tornieri Ahl, 1931
- Hyperolius torrentis Schiøtz, 1967
- Hyperolius tuberculatus (Mocquard, 1897)
- Hyperolius tuberilinguis Smith, 1849
- Hyperolius ukwiva Loader, Lawson, Portik, and Menegon, 2015
- Hyperolius veithi Schick, Kielgast, Rödder, Muchai, Burger, and Lötters, 2010
- Hyperolius vilhenai Laurent, 1964
- Hyperolius viridiflavus (Duméril and Bibron, 1841)
- Hyperolius viridigulosus Schiøtz, 1967
- Hyperolius viridis Schiøtz, 1975
- Hyperolius watsonae Pickersgill, 2007
- Hyperolius wermuthi Laurent, 1961
- Hyperolius xenorhinus Laurent, 1972
- Hyperolius zonatus Laurent, 1958

== Nomina inquirenda ==
The following species are considered nomina inquirenda (species of doubtful identity):

- Rappia granulata Tornier, 1896
- Rappia fimbriata Tornier, 1896
- Hyperolius laticeps Ahl, 1931
- Hyperolius thoracotuberculatus Ahl, 1931
