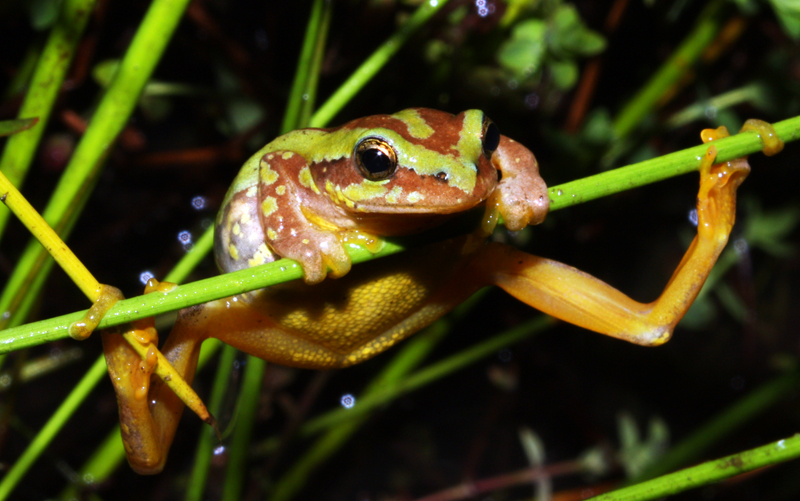

Conservation status
- Least Concern (IUCN 3.1)

Scientific classification
- Kingdom: Animalia
- Phylum: Chordata
- Class: Amphibia
- Order: Anura
- Family: Hyperoliidae
- Genus: Hyperolius
- Species: H. pictus

Binomial name
- Hyperolius pictus Ahl, 1931

= Hyperolius pictus =

Species of frog

Hyperolius pictus is a species of frog in the family Hyperoliidae. It is found in Malawi, Tanzania, and Zambia. Its natural habitats are subtropical or tropical high-altitude grassland, rivers, swamps, freshwater marshes, intermittent freshwater marshes, arable land, pastureland, rural gardens, and ponds.
