= Hyperolius xenorhinus =

Conservation status
- Data Deficient (IUCN 3.1)

Scientific classification
- Kingdom: Animalia
- Phylum: Chordata
- Class: Amphibia
- Order: Anura
- Family: Hyperoliidae
- Genus: Hyperolius
- Species: H. xenorhinus

Binomial name
- Hyperolius xenorhinus Laurent, 1972

Species of frog

Hyperolius xenorhinus is a species of frog in the family Hyperoliidae. It is found in Democratic Republic of the Congo and possibly Uganda. Its natural habitats are subtropical or tropical moist montane forests, rivers, swamps, freshwater marshes, and intermittent freshwater marshes.
