= Hyperolius gularis =

Conservation status
- Data Deficient (IUCN 3.1)

Scientific classification
- Kingdom: Animalia
- Phylum: Chordata
- Class: Amphibia
- Order: Anura
- Family: Hyperoliidae
- Genus: Hyperolius
- Species: H. gularis

Binomial name
- Hyperolius gularis Ahl, 1931

Species of amphibian

Hyperolius gularis is a species of frogs in the family Hyperoliidae.

It is endemic to Angola. Its natural habitats are rivers, freshwater marshes, and intermittent freshwater marshes. Its taxonomic validity is not certain: It may be a synonym of Hyperolius marmoratus, the marbled reed frog.
