= Hyperolius lateralis =

Conservation status
- Least Concern (IUCN 3.1)

Scientific classification
- Kingdom: Animalia
- Phylum: Chordata
- Class: Amphibia
- Order: Anura
- Family: Hyperoliidae
- Genus: Hyperolius
- Species: H. lateralis

Binomial name
- Hyperolius lateralis Laurent, 1940

Species of frog

Hyperolius lateralis is a species of frog in the family Hyperoliidae. It is found in Burundi, Democratic Republic of the Congo, Kenya, Rwanda, Tanzania, and Uganda. Its natural habitats are subtropical or tropical moist lowland forests, subtropical or tropical swamps, subtropical or tropical moist montane forests, rivers, swamps, and heavily degraded former forest. It is threatened by habitat loss.
