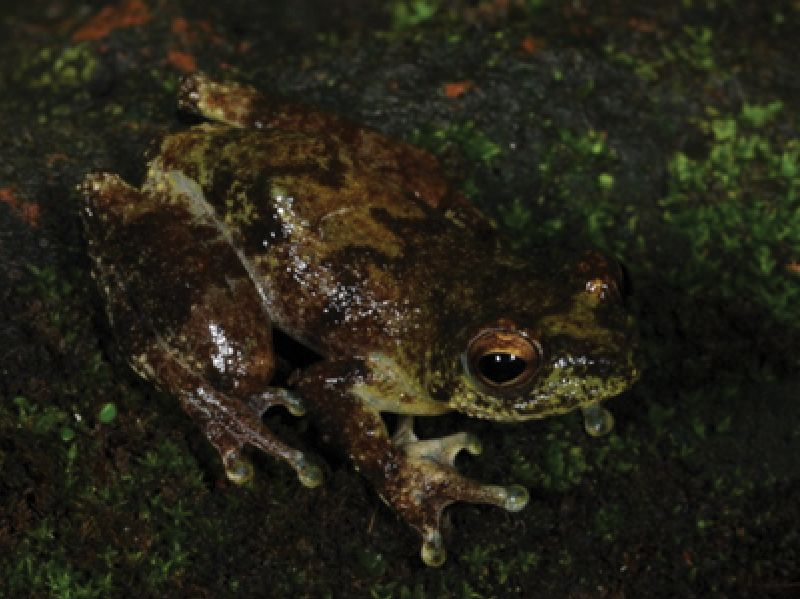
- Male Alexteroon hypsiphonus

Conservation status
- Least Concern (IUCN 3.1)

Scientific classification
- Kingdom: Animalia
- Phylum: Chordata
- Class: Amphibia
- Order: Anura
- Family: Hyperoliidae
- Genus: Hyperolius
- Species: H. hypsiphonus

Binomial name
- Hyperolius hypsiphonus (Amiet, 2000)

Synonyms
- Alexteroon hypsiphonus Amiet, 2000

= Hyperolius hypsiphonus =

Species of frog

Hyperolius hypsiphonus is a species of frog in the family Hyperoliidae. It is found in southern Cameroon, Gabon, Equatorial Guinea, the western Republic of the Congo, and northwestern Angola. Common name cross-banded egg-guarding frog has been proposed for it.

== Description ==
Hyperolius hypsiphonus grow to 28 mm (1.1 in) in snout–vent length. The body is slender while the head is broad with a short snout. The eyes are large. The tympanum is distinct. The finger and toe tips are enlarged into large discs; the webbing is well-developed in both hands and feet. Dorsal skin is granular and has a lichen-like pattern that grayish during the day and dark brown at night. There are numerous black dots and three irregular, black-bordered transverse bands that are reddish brown or have the same color as the dorsum in general. The belly is transparent whitish to turquoise.

== Habitat and conservation ==
This species lives near rivers in rainforest habitats at elevations below 630 m (2,070 ft). It is arboreal; males call from vegetation usually no less than 5 m (16 ft) above the ground. The eggs are laid on leaves above small ponds to which the tadpoles eventually fall.

Hyperolius hypsiphonus is common in suitable habitat, but it is threatened by habitat loss. It is present in the Lopé National Park in Gabon, and probably in some other protected areas too.
