= Hyperolius endjami =

Conservation status
- Least Concern (IUCN 3.1)

Scientific classification
- Kingdom: Animalia
- Phylum: Chordata
- Class: Amphibia
- Order: Anura
- Family: Hyperoliidae
- Genus: Hyperolius
- Species: H. endjami

Binomial name
- Hyperolius endjami Amiet, 1980

Species of frog

Hyperolius endjami is a species of frog in the family Hyperoliidae. It is endemic to Cameroon. Its natural habitats are subtropical or tropical moist lowland forests, subtropical or tropical swamps, subtropical or tropical moist montane forests, shrub-dominated wetlands, freshwater marshes, and intermittent freshwater marshes. It is threatened by habitat loss.
