= Hyperolius protchei =

Conservation status
- Data Deficient (IUCN 3.1)

Scientific classification
- Kingdom: Animalia
- Phylum: Chordata
- Class: Amphibia
- Order: Anura
- Family: Hyperoliidae
- Genus: Hyperolius
- Species: H. protchei

Binomial name
- Hyperolius protchei Rochebrune, 1885

Species of frog

Hyperolius protchei is a species of frog of questionable status in the family Hyperoliidae. Described more than a century ago, it is only known from its type locality, Landana, in the Cabinda Province of northern Angola. The holotype was originally deposited in Museo Bouvier and—if it survives at all—now presumably lies in the National Museum of Natural History, France. Hyperolius maestus might be a synonym of Hyperolius marmoratus.

The etymology of the specific name protchei is not known, but Beolens and colleagues suggest that this species is named for a certain Protche, taxidermist who also collected samples for the French National Museum of Natural History. Common name Rochebrune's reed frog has been proposed for this species.
