= Hyperolius jynx =

Conservation status
- Critically Endangered (IUCN 3.1)

Scientific classification
- Kingdom: Animalia
- Phylum: Chordata
- Class: Amphibia
- Order: Anura
- Family: Hyperoliidae
- Genus: Hyperolius
- Species: H. jynx

Binomial name
- Hyperolius jynx (Amiet, 2000)
- Alexteroon jynx is only known from the Rumpi Hills in Cameroon

Synonyms
- Alexteroon jynx Amiet 2000

Species of amphibian

Hyperolius jynx is a species of frog in the family Hyperoliidae. It is endemic to the Rumpi Hills in south-western Cameroon. The common name smooth egg-guarding frog has been proposed for this species.

== Description ==
Hyperolius jynx grow to 23 mm (0.9 in) in snout–vent length. The body is slender while the head is broad with a rounded snout. The eyes are large. The tympanum is distinct. The finger and toe tips are enlarged into rounded discs; the fingers have basal webbing while the toes have complete webbing. Dorsal skin is granular. The dorsum is yellowish to dark green to green-brown with numerous tiny white spots. There is a reddish-brown spot between the eyes and blotches on the dorsum and limbs; there may reddish-brown spots on the eyelids and the sides of the snout. Skin is ventrally finely granular; the pectoral region is white while the posterior part of the belly is translucent turquoise, with the inner organs visible through the skin.

The male advertisement call is a single blunt, metallic "click" that is repeated irregularly.

== Habitat and conservation ==
Hyperolius jynx is known from forests on the eastern slopes of the Rumpi Hills at elevations of 800–1,050 m (2,620–3,440 ft) above sea level. Its favoured streams have well-aerated, flowing (but not torrential) water. Males call from dense vegetation near streams. The eggs are probably laid in small clumps on leaves above streams, into which the tadpoles fall and develop further.

This species is only known from two localities 6 km apart. Severe forest loss caused by smallholder farming activities, logging, and human settlement is taking place in the Rumpi Hills. Because of its small range and ongoing habitat loss, this species is considered "critically endangered".
