= Hyperolius quadratomaculatus =

Conservation status
- Data Deficient (IUCN 3.1)

Scientific classification
- Kingdom: Animalia
- Phylum: Chordata
- Class: Amphibia
- Order: Anura
- Family: Hyperoliidae
- Genus: Hyperolius
- Species: H. quadratomaculatus

Binomial name
- Hyperolius quadratomaculatus Ahl, 1931

Species of frog

Hyperolius quadratomaculatus is a species of frog in the family Hyperoliidae. It is endemic to Mohorro, Tanzania. Its natural habitats are rivers, freshwater marshes, and intermittent freshwater marshes. It presumably breeds in waterbodies and has a larval development breeding strategy.

== Distribution ==
This species is endemic to Tanzania. Its type locality is the town of Mohorro in the Rufiji district of the Pwani region, but no wild populations are known.
