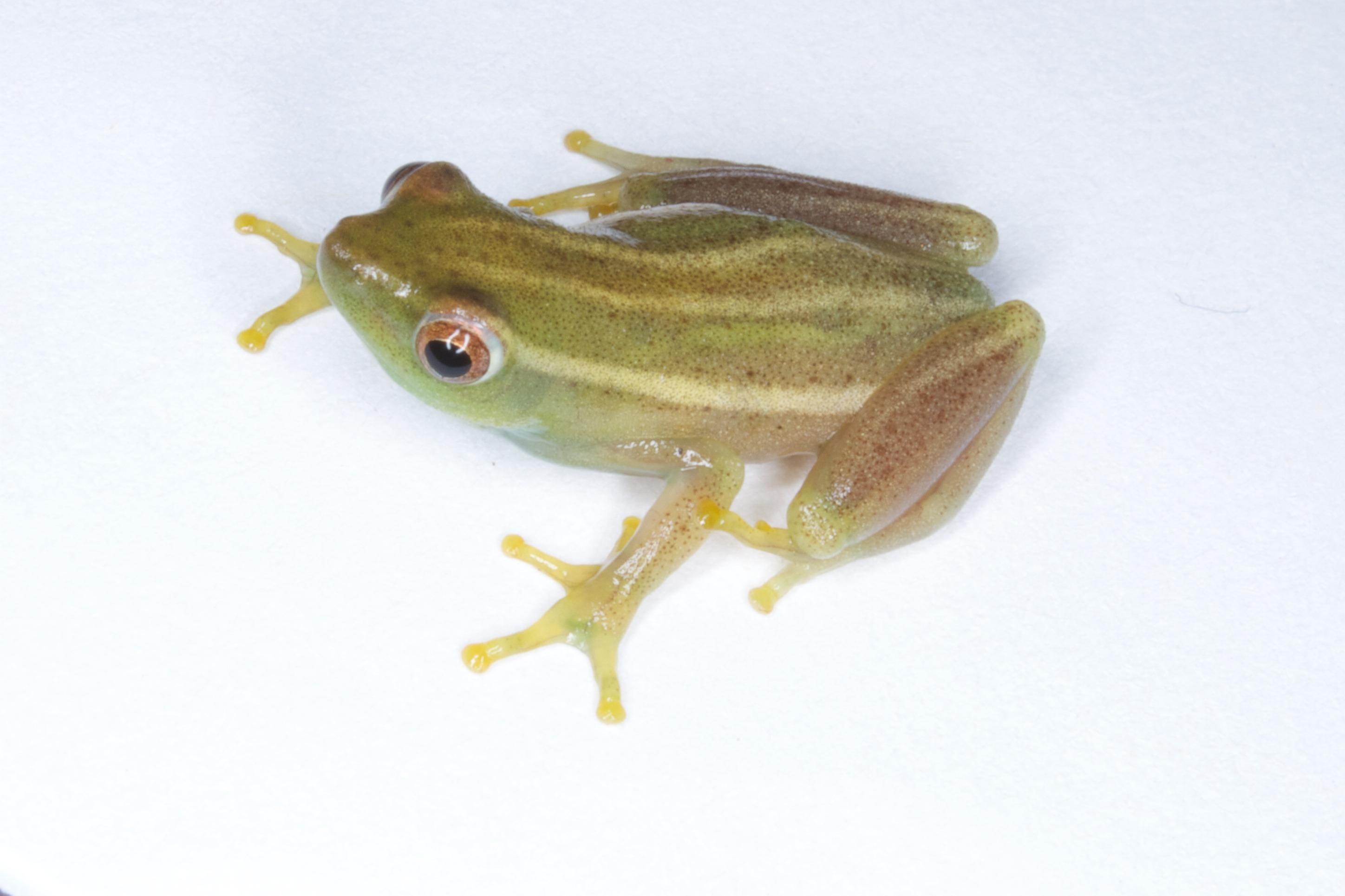

Conservation status
- Least Concern (IUCN 3.1)

Scientific classification
- Kingdom: Animalia
- Phylum: Chordata
- Class: Amphibia
- Order: Anura
- Family: Hyperoliidae
- Genus: Hyperolius
- Species: H. benguellensis

Binomial name
- Hyperolius benguellensis (Bocage, 1893)

Synonyms
- Rappia benguellensis Bocage, 1893; Rappia oxyrhynchus Boulenger, 1901

= Hyperolius benguellensis =

Species of frog

Hyperolius benguellensis (common name: Benguella long reed frog, Benguella reed frog, Bocage's sharp-nosed reed frog) is a species of frog in the family Hyperoliidae. It is found in southern Angola and northern Botswana and Namibia, but other sources cite a wider and more eastern distribution. It is similar to Hyperolius nasutus and have been considered a synonym of that species. Hyperolius benguellensis is not considered threatened.

== Description ==
Male Hyperolius benguellensis grow to a snout–vent length of about 19 mm (0.75 in) and females to about 24 mm (0.94 in). Their body is long and slender. Tadpoles are unknown.

== Habitat and behaviour ==
Hyperolius benguellensis is a common frog associated with moist habitats with emergent vegetation (margins of swamps, rivers and lakes) in savanna and grassland habitats. Male frogs call from elevated positions in vegetation. The call is a brief note consisting of five pulses, followed by 14 pulses at a slower rate.
