= Hyperolius bocagei =

Conservation status
- Least Concern (IUCN 3.1)

Scientific classification
- Kingdom: Animalia
- Phylum: Chordata
- Class: Amphibia
- Order: Anura
- Family: Hyperoliidae
- Genus: Hyperolius
- Species: H. bocagei

Binomial name
- Hyperolius bocagei Steindachner, 1867

Synonyms
- Rappia seabrai Ferreira, 1906; Hyperolius seabrai (Ferreira, 1906)

Species of frog

Hyperolius bocagei is a species of frog in the family Hyperoliidae. It occurs in an area spanning from Angola and northwestern Zambia through southern Democratic Republic of the Congo to southwestern Tanzania. It lives in seasonally flooded, lowland grassy pans. It may suffer localized habitat loss and degradation, but is not considered threatened overall.
