= Hyperolius chrysogaster =

Conservation status
- Near Threatened (IUCN 3.1)

Scientific classification
- Kingdom: Animalia
- Phylum: Chordata
- Class: Amphibia
- Order: Anura
- Family: Hyperoliidae
- Genus: Hyperolius
- Species: H. chrysogaster

Binomial name
- Hyperolius chrysogaster Laurent, 1950

Species of frog

Hyperolius chrysogaster is a species of frog in the family Hyperoliidae. It is endemic to the Rwenzori and northern Itombwe Mountains in the eastern Democratic Republic of the Congo. There are also unconfirmed records from Rwanda.

Its natural habitats are high-altitude montane forests. It is threatened by habitat loss caused by logging, agriculture and human settlements. It occurs in the Virunga National Park, possibly also in the Kahuzi-Biéga National Park and Nyungwe Forest National Park (Rwanda).
