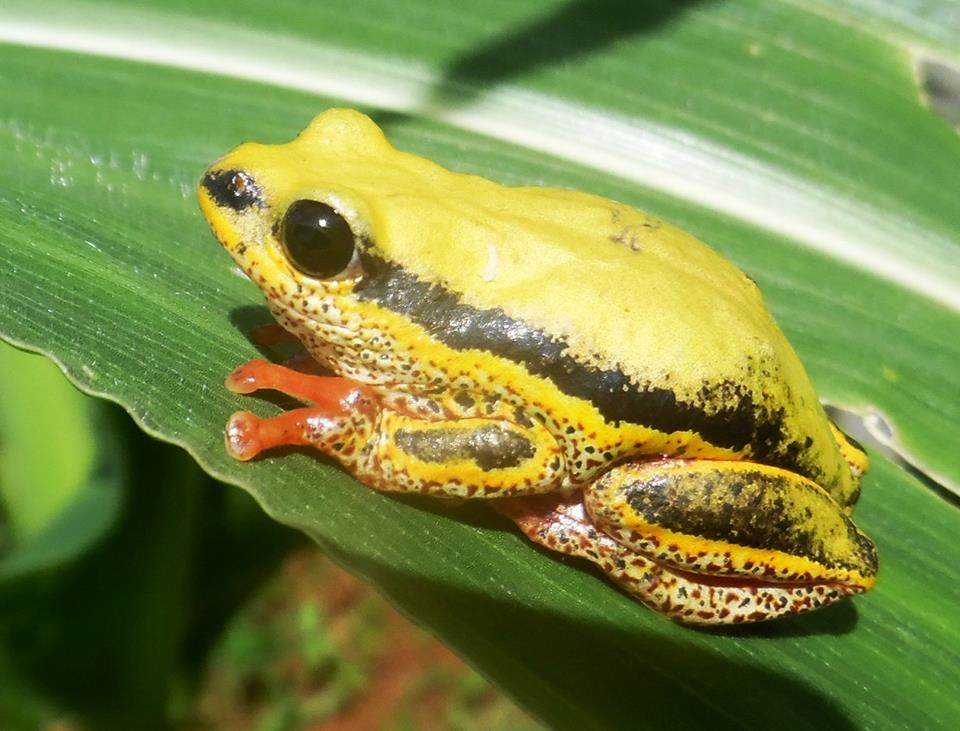
- Hyperolius marginatus on a maize-leaf near Lilongwe, Malawi.

Conservation status
- Least Concern (IUCN 3.1)

Scientific classification
- Kingdom: Animalia
- Phylum: Chordata
- Class: Amphibia
- Order: Anura
- Family: Hyperoliidae
- Genus: Hyperolius
- Species: H. marginatus

Binomial name
- Hyperolius marginatus Peters, 1854

Synonyms
- Hyperolius viridiflavus reesi Schiøtz, 1982; Hyperolius reesi (Schiøtz, 1982); Hyperolius argentovittis Ahl, 1931; Hyperolius albofasciatus Hoffman, 1944; (incomplete list)

= Hyperolius marginatus =

Species of frog

Hyperolius marginatus is a species of frog in the family Hyperoliidae. It has been recorded from the eastern Democratic Republic of the Congo, Tanzania, Malawi, Mozambique, Zambia, and Zimbabwe. However, the limits of its distribution are very uncertain, and it is likely to occur in Burundi and Rwanda too. Common names coined for this species include margined sedge frog and margined reed frog.

Hyperolius marginatus occurs at the margins of swamps, rivers and lakes in all types of savanna, grassland and bush land habitats, and also in many human-modified habitats such as cultivated land, towns, and gardens. It is associated with emergent vegetation. Breeding takes place in a wide range of ponds, both small and large, or temporary and permanent. It is an extremely abundant species that rapidly spreads into new waterbodies. There are no significant threats to it. Furthermore, it occurs in some protected areas.
