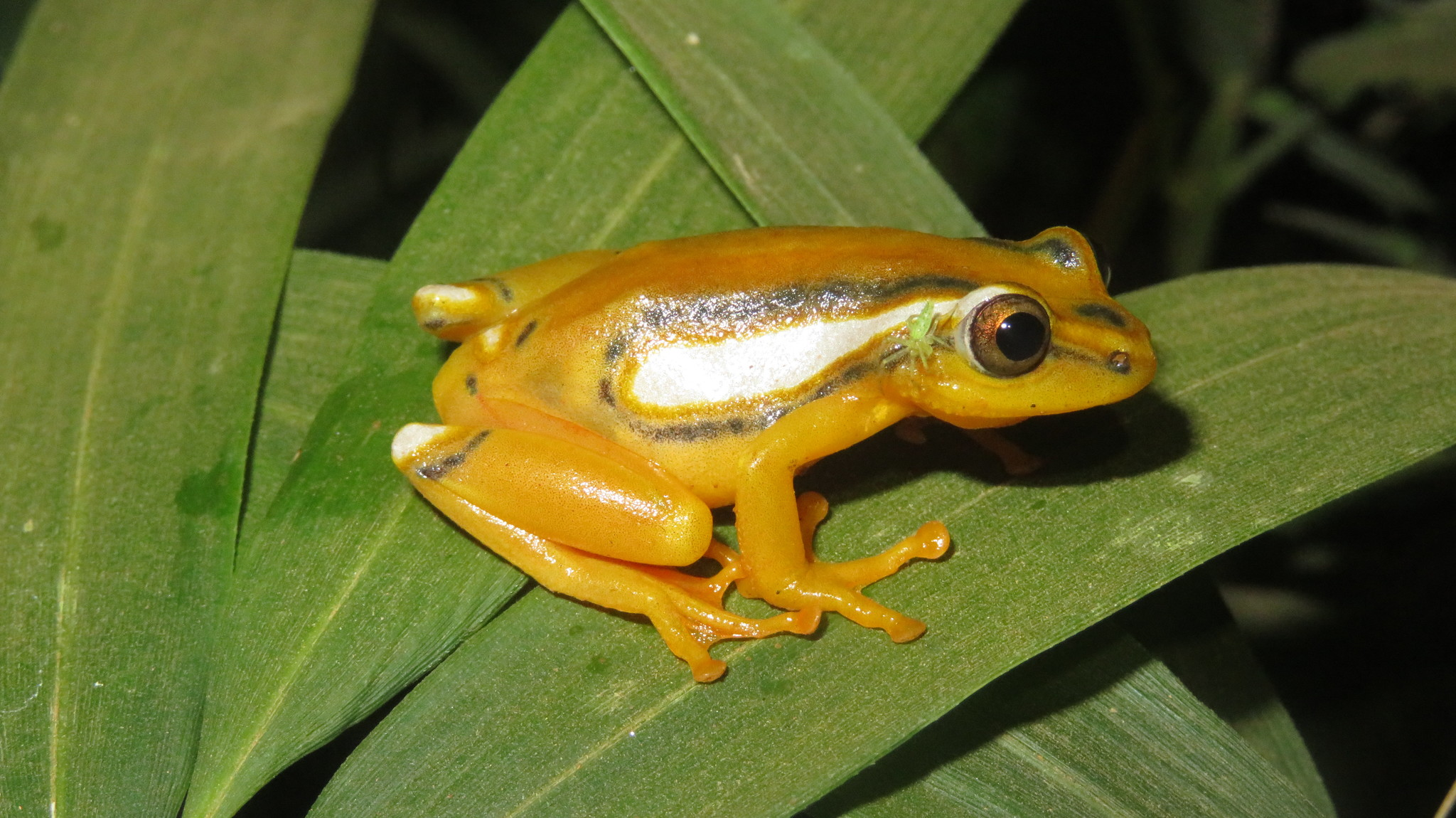

Conservation status
- Endangered (IUCN 3.1)

Scientific classification
- Kingdom: Animalia
- Phylum: Chordata
- Class: Amphibia
- Order: Anura
- Family: Hyperoliidae
- Genus: Hyperolius
- Species: H. rubrovermiculatus

Binomial name
- Hyperolius rubrovermiculatus Schiøtz, 1975

= Hyperolius rubrovermiculatus =

Species of frog

Hyperolius rubrovermiculatus is a species of frog in the family Hyperoliidae. It is endemic to Kenya. Its natural habitats are subtropical or tropical dry forests, moist savanna, swamps, intermittent freshwater marshes, rural gardens, and heavily degraded former forest. It is threatened by habitat loss.

== Description ==
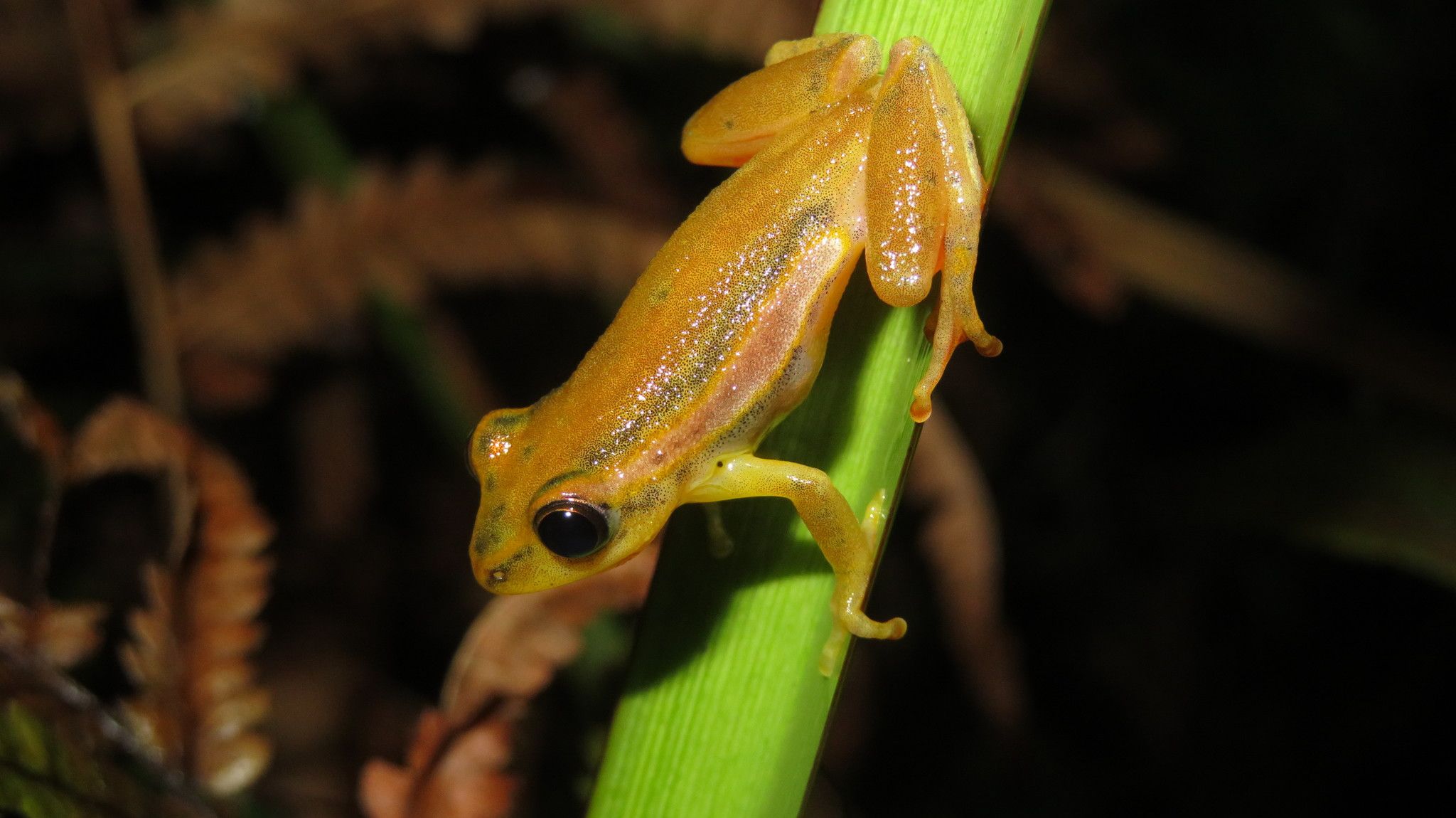

Males are usually 24–30 mm (0.94–1.18 in) and females 28–32 mm (1.1–1.3 in).
