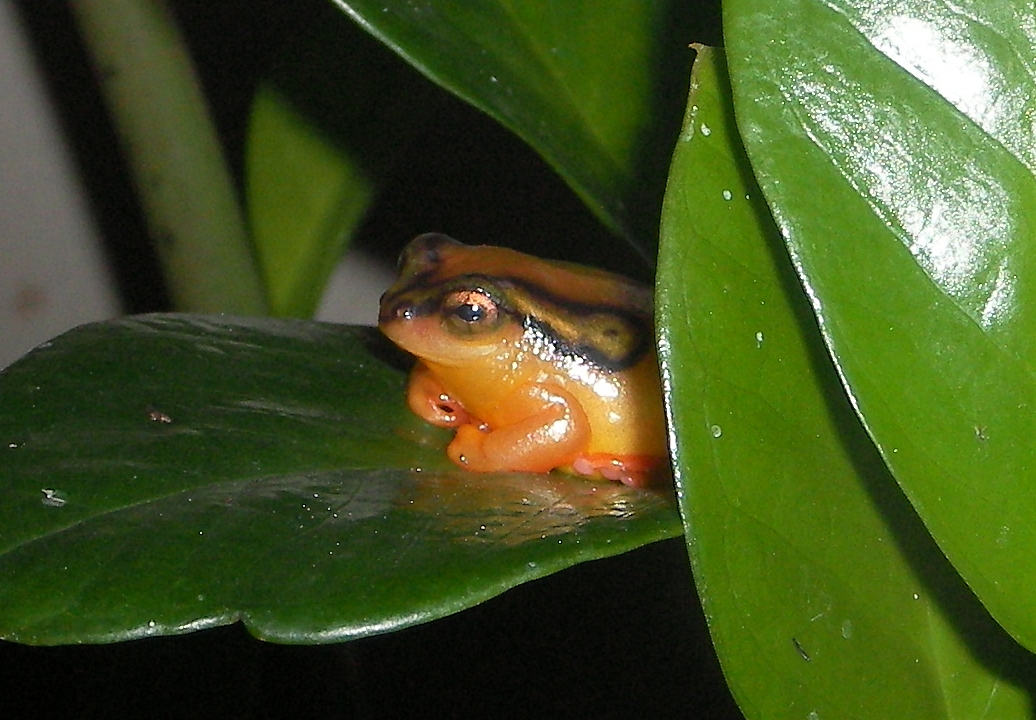

Conservation status
- Endangered (IUCN 3.1)

Scientific classification
- Kingdom: Animalia
- Phylum: Chordata
- Class: Amphibia
- Order: Anura
- Family: Hyperoliidae
- Genus: Hyperolius
- Species: H. puncticulatus

Binomial name
- Hyperolius puncticulatus (Pfeffer, 1893)

Synonyms
- Rappia puncticulata Pfeffer, 1893

= Hyperolius puncticulatus =

Species of frog

Hyperolius puncticulatus is a species of frog in the family Hyperoliidae. It is endemic to Unguja (=Zanzibar), Tanzania. Its natural habitats are dry forest, moist forest, and bush land. It breeds in pools, and males can be heard calling from the surrounding vegetation. Although quite common species within its small range, it is considered endangered by the IUCN because of habitat loss.
