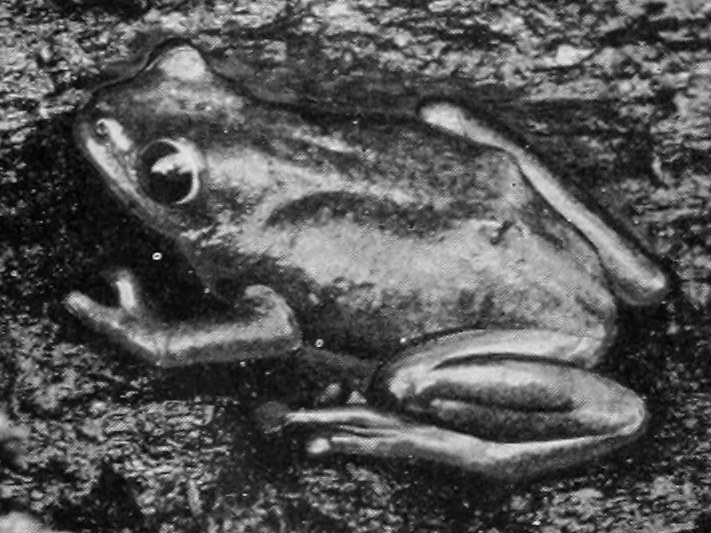

Conservation status
- Least Concern (IUCN 3.1)

Scientific classification
- Kingdom: Animalia
- Phylum: Chordata
- Class: Amphibia
- Order: Anura
- Family: Hyperoliidae
- Genus: Hyperolius
- Species: H. acutirostris

Binomial name
- Hyperolius acutirostris Buchholz and Peters, 1875

Synonyms
- Rappia acutirostris (Buchholz and Peters, 1875)

= Hyperolius acutirostris =

Species of frog

Hyperolius acutirostris is a species of frog in the family Hyperoliidae. It is endemic to southwestern Cameroon, found as far east as the region of Yaoundé. Common name sharpsnout reed frog has been coined for it.

== Description ==
Males measure 20–23 mm (0.79–0.91 in) and adult females 23–29 mm (0.91–1.14 in) in snout–vent length. The dorsal pattern often involves alternating dark and light broad transverse bands. A light band in front of the urostyle is always present. The gular flap is very small. Undersides of the feet, hands, and (often) lower jaw have black pigmentation. There are small tubercles on the dorsum. The canthus rostralis is distinct. The pupils are horizontal.

The male advertisement call is a "clack".

== Habitat and conservation ==
Natural habitats of Hyperolius acutirostris are mature forests at elevations up to 1,300 m (4,300 ft) above sea level. It is a strictly arboreal species, and also reproduction takes place in water in tree holes. It is common in suitable habitat but threatened by habitat loss caused by logging, agriculture, and human settlements.
