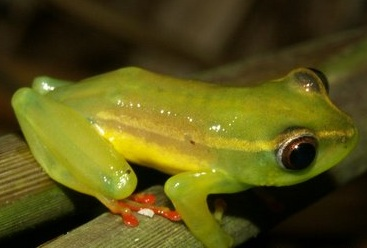
- Hyperolius riggenbachi hieroglyphicus

Conservation status
- Least Concern (IUCN 3.1)

Scientific classification
- Kingdom: Animalia
- Phylum: Chordata
- Class: Amphibia
- Order: Anura
- Family: Hyperoliidae
- Genus: Hyperolius
- Species: H. riggenbachi

Binomial name
- Hyperolius riggenbachi (Nieden, 1910)

= Hyperolius riggenbachi =

Species of amphibian

Hyperolius riggenbachi is a species of frog in the family Hyperoliidae. Its common name is Riggenbach's reed frog. It is found on Bamenda Highlands and the Adamawa Plateau, western and central Cameroon, and Mambilla and Obudu Plateaus of eastern Nigeria. Its natural habitats are wetlands and small wooded watercourses in montane grassland. This species is very common within its small range, but is threatened by habitat loss caused by agricultural activities, wood collection, and human settlement.
