= Hyperolius montanus =

Conservation status
- Least Concern (IUCN 3.1)

Scientific classification
- Kingdom: Animalia
- Phylum: Chordata
- Class: Amphibia
- Order: Anura
- Family: Hyperoliidae
- Genus: Hyperolius
- Species: H. montanus

Binomial name
- Hyperolius montanus (Angel, 1924)

Synonyms
- Rappia montana Angel, 1924

Species of amphibian

Hyperolius montanus (common name: mountain reed frog or montane reed frog) is a species of frog in the family Hyperoliidae. It is endemic to Kenya and known from the Kenya Highlands. It might represent more than one species.

== Description ==
The type series, collected from Mount Kinangop, consists of one male measuring 26 mm (1.0 in) and four females measuring 29–34 mm (1.1–1.3 in) in snout–vent length. Males are reported to vary in SVL between 25 and 38 mm (0.98 and 1.50 in), making them medium to large sized among Hyperolius frogs. Colour pattern is variable. Dorsum is uniformly greyish brown to light brown, yellow, or greenish. A dark brown canthal stripe runs from behind the eye to shoulder or groin. Males have yellow to white throat, or green in green-backed specimens. Ventrum is whitish and feet are whitish to yellowish.

== Habitat and conservation ==
Hyperolius montanus is an adaptable species that lives in montane grassland and farmland, montane rainforest, and moor land at elevations of approximately 1,800–3,100 m (5,900–10,200 ft) asl. It is a common species that is locally abundant. No significant threats have been identified, although pesticides and other agro-chemicals could be a local threat.
