= List of amphibians of the Democratic Republic of the Congo =

This is a List of amphibians of the Democratic Republic of the Congo by family. It lists all families and species of amphibians in the Democratic Republic of the Congo.

The list below follows Frost, 2011: Amphibian Species of the World, an Online Reference. Version 5.5 (31 January 2011), and AmphibiaWeb, by the University of California, Berkeley.

A difference between the two above classifications is that Frost has split the families Dicroglossidae, Phrynobatrachidae, Ptychadenidae, Pyxicephalidae and Rhacophoridae off from the Ranidae (i.e. elevated to distinct families), whereas AmphibiaWeb has not (i.e. keeping them within the Ranidae). In this we follow Frost here.

See Sources below.

== Class Amphibia ==
Total 259 species of Amphibians, in 2 orders, 15 families, 43 genera, in the Democratic Republic of the Congo, a few of which are presumed to occur in DRC but have not yet been found there.

=== Order Anura – Frogs and Toads ===
Total 256 species in 14 families, 40 genera, in the Democratic Republic of the Congo.

  - Family Arthroleptidae – Screeching frogs or squeakers, 46 species in 6 genera in the Democratic Republic of the Congo.
    - Arthroleptis adolfifriederici (Nieden, 1911)
    - Arthroleptis hematogaster (Laurent, 1954)
    - Arthroleptis lameerei (De Witte, 1921)
    - Arthroleptis loveridgei (De Witte, 1933)
    - Arthroleptis phrynoides (Laurent, 1976)
    - Arthroleptis poecilonotus (Peters, 1863)
    - Arthroleptis pyrrhoscelis (Laurent, 1952)
    - Arthroleptis schubotzi (Nieden, 1911); includes Arthroleptis discodactylus
    - Arthroleptis spinalis (Boulenger, 1919)
    - Arthroleptis stenodactylus (Pfeffer, 1893)
    - Arthroleptis sylvaticus (Laurent, 1954)
    - Arthroleptis taeniatus (Boulenger, 1906); presumably in (NW) DRC
    - Arthroleptis tuberosus (Andersson, 1905)
    - Arthroleptis variabilis (Matschie, 1893)
    - Arthroleptis vercammeni (Laurent, 1954)
    - Arthroleptis xenochirus (Boulenger, 1905)
    - Arthroleptis xenodactyloides (Hewitt, 1933); probably in (SE) DRC
    - Astylosternus batesi (Boulenger, 1900)
    - Cardioglossa cyaneospila (Laurent, 1950)
    - Cardioglossa escalerae (Boulenger, 1903)
    - Cardioglossa gracilis (Boulenger, 1900)
    - Cardioglossa gratiosa Amiet, 1972; presumably in (N) DRC
    - Cardioglossa leucomystax (Boulenger, 1903)
    - Leptopelis aubryi (Duméril, 1856)
    - Leptopelis aubryioides (Andersson, 1907); possibly in (W) DRC
    - Leptopelis bocagii (Günther, 1865)
    - Leptopelis boulengeri (Werner, 1898)
    - Leptopelis calcaratus (Boulenger, 1906)
    - Leptopelis christyi (Boulenger, 1912)
    - Leptopelis cynnamomeus (Bocage, 1893)
    - Leptopelis fenestratus (Laurent, 1972
    - Leptopelis fiziensis (Laurent, 1973
    - Leptopelis karissimbensis (Ahl, 1929
    - Leptopelis kivuensis (Ahl, 1929
    - Leptopelis lebeaui (De Witte, 1933)
    - Leptopelis millsoni (Boulenger, 1895)
    - Leptopelis modestus (Werner, 1898)
    - Leptopelis notatus (Peters, 1875)
    - Leptopelis ocellatus (Mocquard, 1902)
    - Leptopelis oryi (Inger, 1968)
    - Leptopelis parbocagii (Poynton and Broadley, 1987)
    - Leptopelis parvus (Schmidt and Inger, 1959)
    - Leptopelis rufus (Reichenow, 1874)
    - Leptopelis viridis (Günther, 1869)
    - Scotobleps gabonicus (Boulenger, 1900)
    - Trichobatrachus robustus (Boulenger, 1900)
  - Family Brevicipitidae – sometimes considered a subfamily, Brevicipitinae of the Microhylidae, see below; 2 species in 1 genus in the Democratic Republic of the Congo.
    - Breviceps mossambicus (Peters, 1854)
    - Breviceps poweri (Parker, 1934)
  - Family Bufonidae – True toads, 22 species in 5 genera in the Democratic Republic of the Congo.
    - Amietophrynus buchneri (Peters, 1882) = Bufo buchneri, presumably in DRC
    - Amietophrynus camerunensis (Parker, 1936) = Bufo camerunensis
    - Amietophrynus channingi (Barej & all., 2011) = Bufo channingi
    - Amietophrynus fuliginatus (De Witte, 1932) = Bufo fuliginatus
    - Amietophrynus funereus (Bocage, 1866) = Bufo funereus
    - Amietophrynus gracilipes (Boulenger, 1899) = Bufo gracilipes
    - Amietophrynus gutturalis (Power, 1927) = Bufo gutturalis
    - Amietophrynus kisoloensis (Loveridge, 1932) = Bufo kisoloensis
    - Amietophrynus latifrons (Boulenger, 1900) = Bufo latifrons
    - Amietophrynus lemairii (Boulenger, 1901) = Bufo lemairii
    - Amietophrynus maculatus (Hallowell, 1854) = Bufo maculatus
    - Amietophrynus regularis (Reuss, 1833) = Bufo regularis
    - Amietophrynus steindachneri (Pfeffer, 1893) = Bufo steindachneri, presumably in DRC
    - Amietophrynus superciliaris (Boulenger, 1888) = Bufo superciliaris
    - Amietophrynus tuberosus (Günther, 1858) = Bufo tuberosus
    - Laurentophryne parkeri (Laurent, 1950)
    - Mertensophryne melanopleura (Schmidt and Inger, 1959) = Bufo melanopleura
    - Mertensophryne schmidti (Grandison, 1972) = Bufo schmidti
    - Mertensophryne taitana (Peters, 1878) = Bufo taitanus
    - Nectophryne afra (Buchholz and Peters in Peters, 1875)
    - Nectophryne batesii (Boulenger, 1913)
    - Schismaderma carens (Smith, 1848)
  - Family: Dicroglossidae, sometimes considered part of the family Ranidae, see below; 1 species in the Democratic Republic of the Congo.
    - Hoplobatrachus occipitalis (Günther, 1858)
  - Family Hemisotidae – Shovelnose frogs, 5 species in 1 genus in the Democratic Republic of the Congo.
    - Hemisus guineensis (Cope, 1865)
    - Hemisus marmoratus (Peters, 1854)
    - Hemisus olivaceus (Laurent, 1963)
    - Hemisus perreti (Laurent, 1972)
    - Hemisus wittei (Laurent, 1963)
  - Family Hyperoliidae – Sedge frogs or bush frogs, 87 species in 11 genera in the Democratic Republic of the Congo.
    - Acanthixalus spinosus (Buchholz and Peters in Peters, 1875)
    - Afrixalus "quadrivittatus" Pickersgill, 2007; not A. quadrivittatus, uncertain species, possibly same as A. fulvovittatus or Afrixalus vittiger
    - Afrixalus dorsalis (Peters, 1875)
    - Afrixalus equatorialis (Laurent, 1941)
    - Afrixalus fulvovittatus (Cope, 1861); in Congo? Or limited to West Africa?
    - Afrixalus laevis (Ahl, 1930)
    - Afrixalus leucostictus (Laurent, 1950)
    - Afrixalus orophilus (Laurent, 1947)
    - Afrixalus osorioi (Ferreira, 1906)
    - Afrixalus quadrivittatus (Werner, 1908)
    - Afrixalus upembae (Laurent, 1941)
    - Afrixalus weidholzi (Mertens, 1938)
    - Afrixalus wittei (Laurent, 1941)
    - Alexteroon hypsiphonus (Amiet, 2000); doubtful occurrence in (NW) DRC
    - Callixalus pictus (Laurent, 1950)
    - Chrysobatrachus cupreonitens (Laurent, 1951)
    - Cryptothylax greshoffii (Schilthuis, 1889)
    - Cryptothylax minutus (Laurent, 1976)
    - Hyperolius acuticeps (Ahl, 1931); distinct from H. nasutus
    - Hyperolius adspersus (Peters, 1877)
    - Hyperolius atrigularis (Laurent, 1941)
    - Hyperolius balfouri (Werner, 1908)
    - Hyperolius benguellensis (Bocage, 1893)
    - Hyperolius bocagei (Steindachner, 1867); uncertain species, possibly same as H. viridiflavus or H. kachalolae
    - Hyperolius bolifambae Mertens, 1938; doubtful occurrence in (NW) DRC
    - Hyperolius brachiofasciatus (Ahl, 1931)
    - Hyperolius castaneus (Ahl, 1931)
    - Hyperolius chrysogaster (Laurent, 1950)
    - Hyperolius cinereus (Monard, 1937); probably in (SW) DRC
    - Hyperolius cinnamomeoventris (Bocage, 1866)
    - Hyperolius constellatus (Laurent, 1951); distinct from H. castaneus
    - Hyperolius dartevellei Laurent, 1943
    - Hyperolius diaphanus (Laurent, 1972)
    - Hyperolius discodactylus (Ahl, 1931); includes Hyperolius alticola
    - Hyperolius ferrugineus (Laurent, 1943)
    - Hyperolius frontalis (Laurent, 1950)
    - Hyperolius ghesquieri (Laurent, 1943)
    - Hyperolius glandicolor (Peters, 1878); probably in (E) DRC
    - Hyperolius hutsebauti (Laurent, 1956)
    - Hyperolius inornatus (Laurent, 1943)
    - Hyperolius jacobseni Channing et al., 2013; doubtful occurrence in (NW) DRC
    - Hyperolius kachalolae (Schiøtz, 1975); probably in (S) DRC
    - Hyperolius kibarae (Laurent, 1957)
    - Hyperolius kivuensis (Ahl, 1931); includes Hyperolius raveni
    - Hyperolius kuligae (Mertens, 1940)
    - Hyperolius langi (Noble, 1924)
    - Hyperolius lateralis (Laurent, 1940)
    - Hyperolius leleupi (Laurent, 1951)
    - Hyperolius leucotaenius (Laurent, 1950)
    - Hyperolius lucani (Rochebrune, 1885); doubtful species, probably same as H. ocellatus, doubtful occurrence in (W) DRC
    - Hyperolius maestus (Rochebrune, 1885); doubtful species, probably same as H. viridiflavus or H. marmoratus, doubtful occurrence in (W) DRC
    - Hyperolius major (Laurent, 1957)
    - Hyperolius marginatus (Peters, 1854)
    - Hyperolius mariae (Barbour and Loveridge, 1928)
    - Hyperolius marmoratus Rapp, 1842
    - Hyperolius nasicus (Laurent, 1943)
    - Hyperolius nasutus (Günther, 1865)
    - Hyperolius obscurus (Laurent, 1943)
    - Hyperolius ocellatus (Günther, 1858)
    - Hyperolius parallelus (Günther, 1858)
    - Hyperolius pardalis Laurent, 1948; doubtful occurrence in (NW) DRC
    - Hyperolius phantasticus (Boulenger, 1899)
    - Hyperolius platyceps (Boulenger, 1900)
    - Hyperolius polli (Laurent, 1943)
    - Hyperolius polystictus (Laurent, 1943)
    - Hyperolius poweri (Loveridge, 1938); probably in (E) DRC
    - Hyperolius protchei (Rochebrune, 1885); doubtful species, probably same as H. viridiflavus or H. marmoratus, doubtful occurrence in (W) DRC
    - Hyperolius pustulifer (Laurent, 1940)
    - Hyperolius quinquevittatus (Bocage, 1866)
    - Hyperolius rhizophilus (Rochebrune, 1885); doubtful species, doubtful occurrence in (W) DRC
    - Hyperolius robustus (Laurent, 1979)
    - Hyperolius rwandae Channing et al., 2013; doubtful occurrence in (E) DRC
    - Hyperolius sankuruensis (Laurent, 1979)
    - Hyperolius schoutedeni (Laurent, 1943)
    - Hyperolius steindachneri (Bocage, 1866)
    - Hyperolius tuberculatus (Mocquard, 1897)
    - Hyperolius veithi Schick, Kielgast, Rödder, Muchai, Burger, and Lötters, 2010
    - Hyperolius vilhenai (Laurent, 1964); probably in (W) DRC
    - Hyperolius viridiflavus (Duméril and Bibron, 1841)
    - Hyperolius viridis (Schiøtz, 1975); probably in (SE) DRC
    - Hyperolius xenorhinus (Laurent, 1972)
    - Kassina decorata (Angel, 1940)
    - Kassina kuvangensis (Monard, 1937); probably in (S) DRC
    - Kassina maculosa (Sternfeld, 1917)
    - Kassina mertensi (Laurent, 1952)
    - Kassina senegalensis (Duméril and Bibron, 1841)
    - Kassinula wittei (Laurent, 1940)
    - Opisthothylax immaculatus (Boulenger, 1903)
    - Phlyctimantis leonardi (Boulenger, 1906)
    - Phlyctimantis verrucosus (Boulenger, 1912)
  - Family Microhylidae – Narrow-mouthed frogs, 3 species in 1 genus in the Democratic Republic of the Congo.
    - Phrynomantis affinis Boulenger, 1901
    - Phrynomantis bifasciatus (Smith, 1847)
    - Phrynomantis microps Peters, 1875
  - Family: Petropedetidae, 1 species in the Democratic Republic of the Congo.
    - Conraua crassipes (Buchholz and Peters in Peters, 1875)
  - Family Phrynobatrachidae – sometimes considered part of the family Ranidae, see below; 25 species in 1 genus in the Democratic Republic of the Congo.
    - Phrynobatrachus acutirostris Nieden, 1913
    - Phrynobatrachus africanus (Hallowell, 1858); possibly in (W) DRC
    - Phrynobatrachus albomarginatus De Witte, 1933
    - Phrynobatrachus anotis Schmidt and Inger, 1959
    - Phrynobatrachus asper Laurent, 1951
    - Phrynobatrachus auritus Boulenger, 1900
    - Phrynobatrachus bequaerti (Barbour and Loveridge, 1929)
    - Phrynobatrachus calcaratus (Peters, 1863); doubtful occurrence in (NW) DRC
    - Phrynobatrachus congicus (Ahl, 1925); uncertain species, uncertain occurrence in DRC
    - Phrynobatrachus cryptotis Schmidt and Inger, 1959
    - Phrynobatrachus dalcqi Laurent, 1952
    - Phrynobatrachus dendrobates (Boulenger, 1919)
    - Phrynobatrachus gastoni Barbour and Loveridge, 1928
    - Phrynobatrachus giorgii De Witte, 1921
    - Phrynobatrachus graueri (Nieden, 1911)
    - Phrynobatrachus mababiensis FitzSimons, 1932
    - Phrynobatrachus natalensis (Smith, 1849)
    - Phrynobatrachus parkeri De Witte, 1933
    - Phrynobatrachus parvulus (Boulenger, 1905)
    - Phrynobatrachus perpalmatus Boulenger, 1898
    - Phrynobatrachus petropedetoides Ahl, 1924
    - Phrynobatrachus rouxi (Nieden, 1913); In (Eastern) Congo?
    - Phrynobatrachus rungwensis (Loveridge, 1932)
    - Phrynobatrachus scapularis (De Witte, 1933)
    - Phrynobatrachus versicolor Ahl, 1924
  - Family Pipidae – Tongueless frogs or clawed frogs, 17 species in 3 genera in the Democratic Republic of the Congo.
    - Hymenochirus boettgeri (Tornier, 1896)
    - Hymenochirus boulengeri De Witte, 1930
    - Hymenochirus curtipes Noble, 1924
    - Silurana epitropicalis (Fischberg, Colombelli, and Picard, 1982) = Xenopus epitropicalis
    - Silurana tropicalis Gray, 1864 = Xenopus tropicalis, possibly not in DRC (in DRC being synonymous with Silurana epitropicalis)
    - Xenopus andrei Loumont, 1983; possibly in (W) DRC
    - Xenopus fraseri Boulenger, 1905
    - Xenopus itombwensis Evans, Carter, Tobias, Kelley, Hanner, and Tinsley, 2008
    - Xenopus laevis (Daudin, 1802)
    - Xenopus lenduensis Evans, Greenbaum, Kusamba, Carter, Tobias, Mendel, and Kelley, 2011
    - Xenopus muelleri (Peters, 1844)
    - Xenopus petersii Bocage, 1895
    - Xenopus pygmaeus Loumont, 1986
    - Xenopus ruwenzoriensis Tymowska and Fischberg, 1973
    - Xenopus vestitus Laurent, 1972
    - Xenopus victorianus Ahl, 1924
    - Xenopus wittei Tinsley, Kobel, and Fischberg, 1979
  - Family Ptychadenidae – sometimes considered part of the family Ranidae, see below; 29 species in 2 genera in the Democratic Republic of the Congo.
    - Hildebrandtia ornata (Peters, 1878)
    - Ptychadena aequiplicata (Werner, 1898)
    - Ptychadena anchietae (Bocage, 1868)
    - Ptychadena ansorgii (Boulenger, 1905)
    - Ptychadena bibroni (Hallowell, 1845)
    - Ptychadena bunoderma (Boulenger, 1907); presumably in (SW) DRC
    - Ptychadena christyi (Boulenger, 1919)
    - Ptychadena chrysogaster Laurent, 1954
    - Ptychadena grandisonae Laurent, 1954
    - Ptychadena guibei Laurent, 1954
    - Ptychadena hylaea Schmidt and Inger, 1959; possibly same as P. mascareniensis
    - Ptychadena ingeri Perret, 1991
    - Ptychadena keilingi (Monard, 1937)
    - Ptychadena mascareniensis (Duméril and Bibron, 1841)
    - Ptychadena nilotica (Seetzen, 1855); distinct from P. mascareniensis, possibly in (E) DRC
    - Ptychadena obscura (Schmidt and Inger, 1959)
    - Ptychadena oxyrhynchus (Smith, 1849)
    - Ptychadena perplicata Laurent, 1964; presumably in (S) DRC
    - Ptychadena perreti Guibé and Lamotte, 1958
    - Ptychadena porosissima (Steindachner, 1867)
    - Ptychadena pumilio (Boulenger, 1920)
    - Ptychadena schillukorum (Werner, 1908); probably in DRC
    - Ptychadena straeleni (Inger, 1968)
    - Ptychadena subpunctata (Bocage, 1866)
    - Ptychadena taenioscelis Laurent, 1954
    - Ptychadena tellinii (Peracca, 1904)
    - Ptychadena trinodis (Boettger, 1881)
    - Ptychadena upembae (Schmidt and Inger, 1959)
    - Ptychadena uzungwensis (Loveridge, 1932)
  - Family Pyxicephalidae – sometimes considered part of the family Ranidae, see below; 10 species in 5 genera in the Democratic Republic of the Congo.
    - Amietia amieti (Laurent, 1976)
    - Amietia angolensis (Bocage, 1866)
    - Amietia desaegeri (Laurent, 1972)
    - Amietia ruwenzorica (Laurent, 1972)
    - Amietia wittei (Angel, 1924)
    - Aubria masako Ohler and Kazadi, 1990; possibly indistinct from Aubria subsigillata
    - Cacosternum boettgeri (Boulenger, 1882); probably in DRC (highlands)
    - Cacosternum leleupi Laurent, 1950
    - Pyxicephalus adspersus Tschudi, 1838; probably in (S) DRC
    - Tomopterna tuberculosa (Boulenger, 1882)
  - Family Ranidae – True frogs, 6 species in 1 genus in the Democratic Republic of the Congo
    - Hylarana albolabris (Hallowell, 1856) = Amnirana albolabris
    - Hylarana amnicola Perret, 1977 = Amnirana amnicola, presumably in DRC
    - Hylarana darlingi (Boulenger, 1902) = Amnirana darlingi
    - Hylarana galamensis (Duméril and Bibron, 1841) = Amnirana galamensis
    - Hylarana lemairei (De Witte, 1921) = Amnirana lemairei
    - Hylarana lepus (Andersson, 1903) = Amnirana lepus
  - Family Rhacophoridae – Moss frogs, 2 species in 1 genus in the Democratic Republic of the Congo
    - Chiromantis rufescens (Günther, 1869)
    - Chiromantis xerampelina Peters, 1854; probably in (S) DRC

=== Order Caudata – Salamanders ===
There are no salamanders in the Democratic Republic of the Congo, nor in tropical Africa.

=== Order Gymnophiona – Caecilian ===
Total 3 species in 3 genera in 1 family, in the Democratic Republic of the Congo

  - Family Caeciliidae – Common caecilians, 3 species in 3 genera:
    - Boulengerula fischeri Nussbaum and Hinkel, 1994; possibly in (E) DRC
    - Geotrypetes seraphini (Duméril, 1859)
    - Herpele squalostoma (Stutchbury, 1836)

== See also ==
- List of amphibians
- List of birds of the Democratic Republic of Congo
- List of mammals of the Democratic Republic of the Congo
- List of reptiles of the Democratic Republic of the Congo
- Lists of amphibians by region

=== Sources, external links ===
Based on the following two sources:

- Frost, Darrel R. 2013. Amphibian Species of the World: an Online Reference. Version 5.6 (2013). Electronic Database accessible at https://web.archive.org/web/20071024033938/http://research.amnh.org/herpetology/amphibia/index.php. American Museum of Natural History, New York, USA. See: Amphibian Species of the World
- AmphibiaWeb
