= Hyperolius schoutedeni =

Conservation status
- Least Concern (IUCN 3.1)

Scientific classification
- Kingdom: Animalia
- Phylum: Chordata
- Class: Amphibia
- Order: Anura
- Family: Hyperoliidae
- Genus: Hyperolius
- Species: H. schoutedeni

Binomial name
- Hyperolius schoutedeni Laurent, 1943

Species of amphibian

Hyperolius schoutedeni is a species of frog in the family Hyperoliidae. It is known from the northern half of the Democratic Republic of the Congo, central-west and southeastern Republic of the Congo, and southeastern Gabon; its true range probably extends into the adjacent Central African Republic and South Sudan. It is morphologically very similar to Hyperolius cinnamomeoventris and has been confused with that species. However, molecular data suggests that its closest relatives include Hyperolius kivuensis, Hyperolius balfouri, and Hyperolius quinquevittatus, rather than H. cinnamomeoventris.

== Etymology and common names ==
The specific name schoutedeni honours Henri Schouteden, Belgian zoologist who made many expeditions to Congo. Common names Kunungu reed frog (Kunungu being the type locality) and Schouteden's reed frog have been proposed for it.

== Description ==
Males grow to 25 mm (1.0 in) and females to 28 mm (1.1 in) in snout–vent length. The snout is rounded. The fingers and toes bear discs of similar sizes. Colouration is beige. There is a pair of yellow dorsolateral stripes as well as a yellow mid-dorsal stripe outlined with black. Unlike many other Hyperolius, colouration is not sexually dimorphic.

The male advertisement call is a double-click, consisting of two clicks emitted about 1.75 seconds apart.

== Habitat and conservation ==
Hyperolius schoutedeni is a (moist) savanna species, possibly also occurring in clearings in the forest zone. Breeding takes place in bodies of water (marshes, ponds, springs and marshy vegetation along small streams).

The population status of Hyperolius schoutedeni is poorly known, but it is at least locally common (e.g., in the Garamba National Park) and is believed to be adaptable and unlikely to be facing significant threats.
