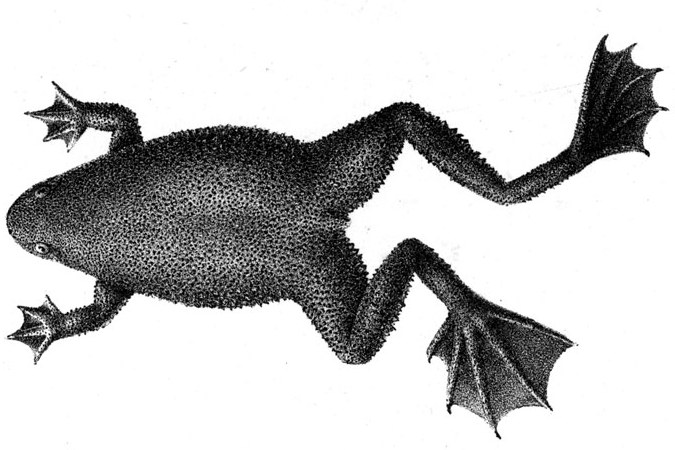

Conservation status
- Data Deficient (IUCN 3.1)

Scientific classification
- Kingdom: Animalia
- Phylum: Chordata
- Class: Amphibia
- Order: Anura
- Family: Pipidae
- Genus: Hymenochirus
- Species: H. feae

Binomial name
- Hymenochirus feae Boulenger, 1906

= Hymenochirus feae =

Species of frog

Hymenochirus feae, also known as Gaboon dwarf clawed frog, is a species of frog in the family Pipidae. It is endemic to Gabon and is only known with certainty from its type locality on the coast of central Gabon. The specific name feae honors Leonardo Fea, an Italian explorer, zoologist, and naturalist.

Hymenochirus feae presumably is ecologically similar to Hymenochirus boettgeri, an aquatic frog that occurs in still, shaded water in lowland rainforest, and in pools by slow-flowing rivers. Threats to this little-known species are unknown.
