= Rainforest frog (disambiguation) =

The rainforest frog is a genus of microhylid frogs.

Rainforest frog may also refer to:

- Rainforest reed frog, a frog found in Cameroon, Central African Republic, Republic of the Congo, Democratic Republic of the Congo, Equatorial Guinea, Gabon, and Nigeria
- Rainforest rocket frog, a frog found in Costa Rica and Panama

== See also ==
- Forest rain frog
