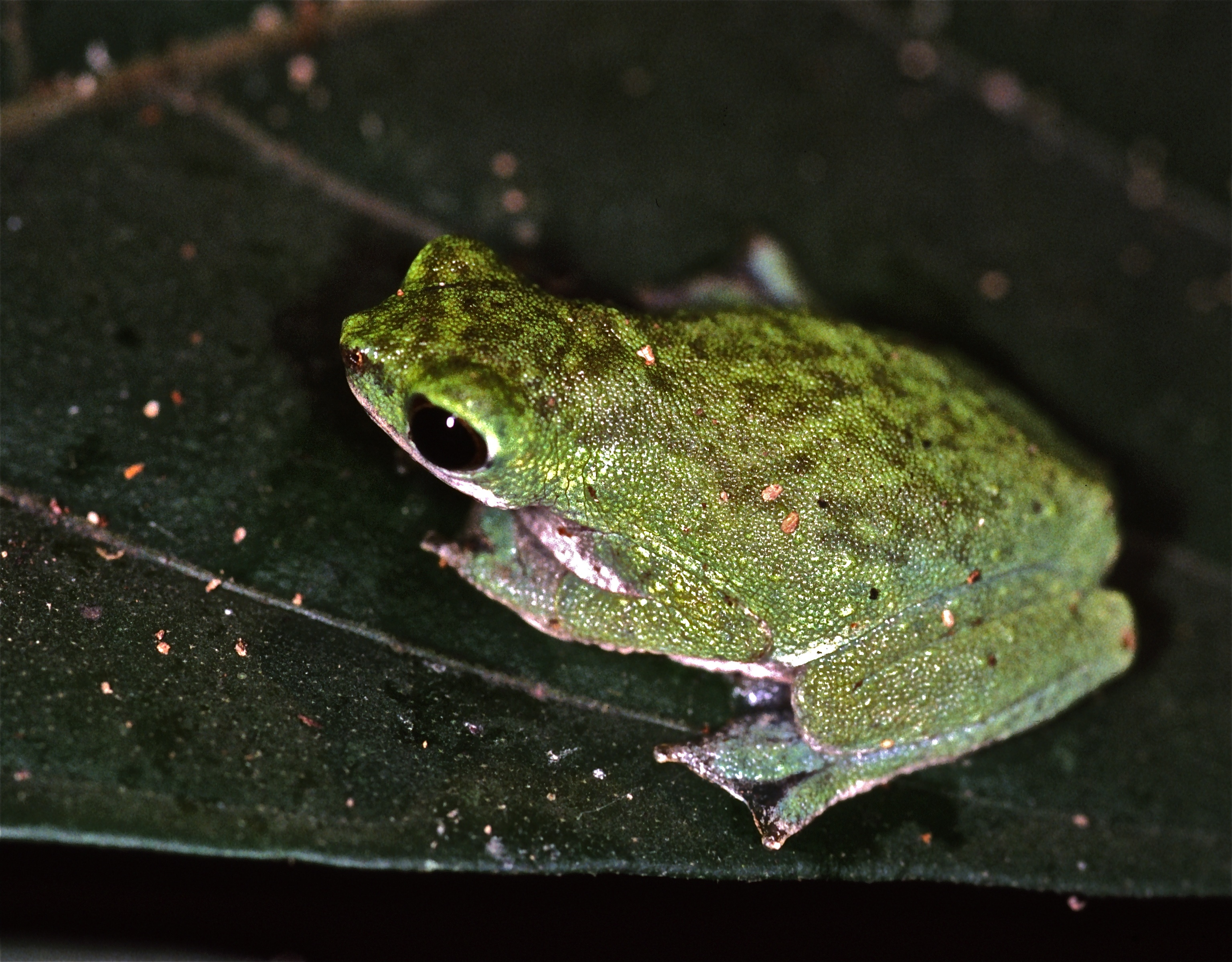
- Nectophryne afra

Scientific classification
- Kingdom: Animalia
- Phylum: Chordata
- Class: Amphibia
- Order: Anura
- Family: Bufonidae
- Genus: Nectophryne; Buchholz & Peters, 1875

Diversity
- 2 species (see text)

= Nectophryne =

Genus of amphibians

Nectophryne, or African tree toads, is a small genus of true toads with only two species. They are native to West and Central Africa: Nigeria, Cameroon, Gabon, northeastern Congo, Bioko and Equatorial Guinea. Nectophryne afra uses small bodies of water to lay its eggs which are then guarded by the male.

== Species ==
The genus contains two species.

Binomial name and author	Common name
Nectophryne afra Buchholz & Peters in Peters, 1875	African tree toad
Nectophryne batesii Boulenger, 1913	Bates's tree toad
