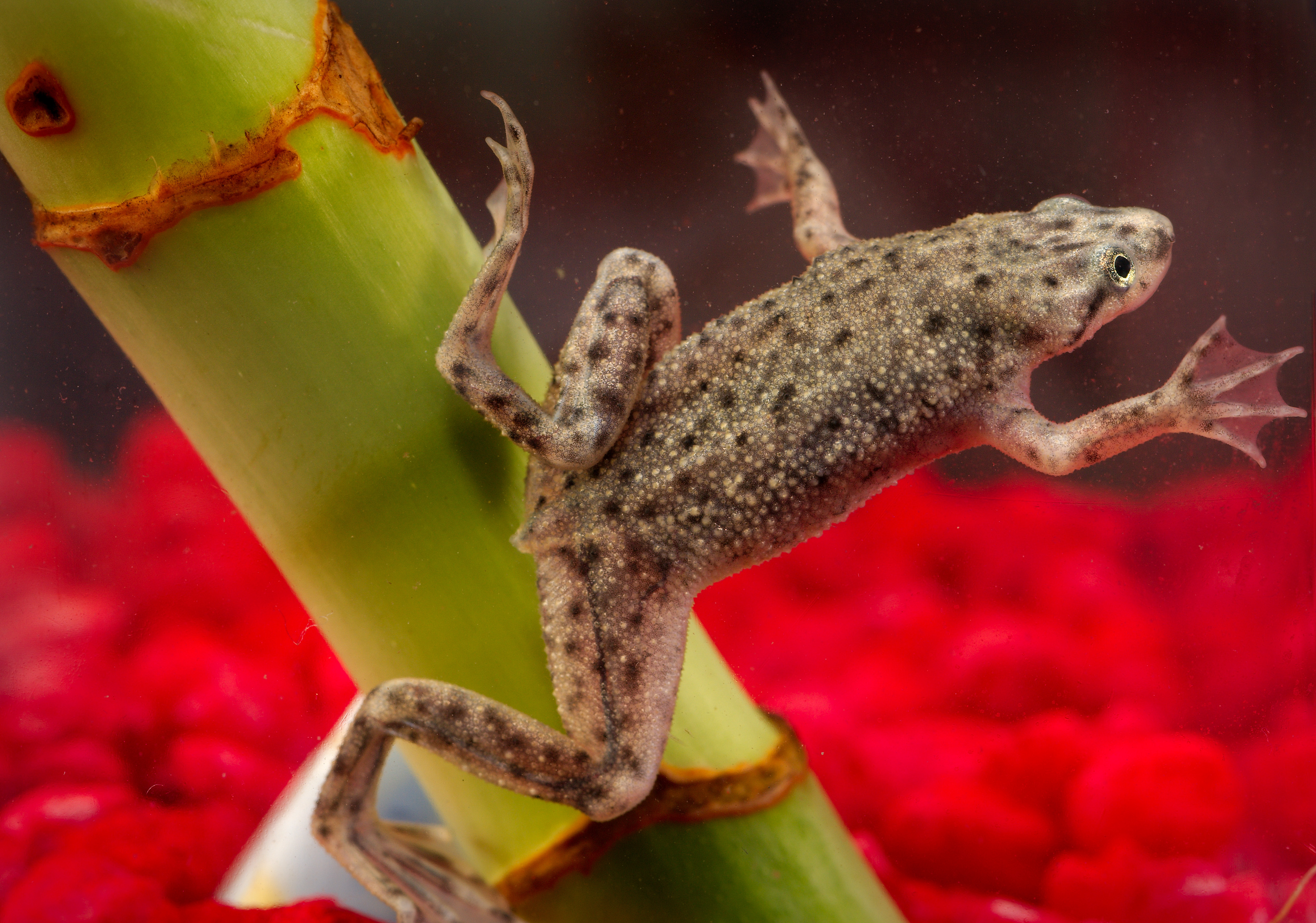
- Hymenochirus boettgeri

Scientific classification
- Kingdom: Animalia
- Phylum: Chordata
- Class: Amphibia
- Order: Anura
- Family: Pipidae
- Genus: Hymenochirus; Boulenger, 1896

Type species
- Hymenochirus boettgeri Tornier, 1896

Species
- 4 species (see text)

= African dwarf frog =

African dwarf frogs

Genus of amphibians

African dwarf frog is the common name for members of Hymenochirus, a genus of aquatic frog native to parts of Equatorial Africa. They are common in the pet trade and are often mistaken for the African clawed frog, a similar-looking frog in the same family. Their common name is obtained from their place of origin and the claws on their hind legs.

== Distribution ==
African dwarf frogs occur in forested parts of equatorial Africa, from Nigeria and Cameroon in the north, and south through Gabon and east throughout the Congo River Basin.

== Species ==
There are four species:

- Zaire dwarf clawed frog, Hymenochirus boettgeri Tornier, 1896
- Eastern dwarf clawed frog, Hymenochirus boulengeri De Witte, 1930
- Western dwarf clawed frog, Hymenochirus curtipes Noble, 1924
- Gaboon dwarf clawed frog, Hymenochirus feae Boulenger, 1906

== Description ==
African dwarf frogs live their entire lives underwater but need to rise to the surface to breathe air as they have lungs and not gills. These frogs are small and do not weigh more than a few grams. They vary in color, mostly ranging from olive green to brown with black spots. The average life expectancy of these frogs is five years, but they have been known to live longer than 20 years, and they can grow from 1 to 1.5 inches (2.5 to 3.8 cm). African dwarf frogs can be mistaken for and are often sold as young African clawed frogs, of the genus Xenopus, which are larger and more aggressive than the dwarf.

All species of Pipidae are tongueless, toothless, and completely aquatic. They use their webbed feet to shove food in their mouths and down their throats and a hyobranchial pump to draw or suck food into their mouths. Pipidae have powerful legs for swimming and lunging after food. They also use the claws on their feet to tear pieces of large food. They lack true ears but have lateral lines running down the length of their bodies and undersides; this is how they can sense movements and vibration in the water. To find food, they use their sensitive fingers, sense of smell, and lateral line system. They are scavengers and will eat anything living, dying, or dead and any type of organic detritus.

These frogs have tiny black claws on their hind legs, which caused one of their discoverers, Oskar Boettger, to originally call them African dwarf clawed frogs, but they quickly lose these black tips in the sharp pebble environments and are more commonly called African dwarf frogs today. African dwarf frogs can swim up to 4 miles per hour (6.4 km/h).

== Habitat ==
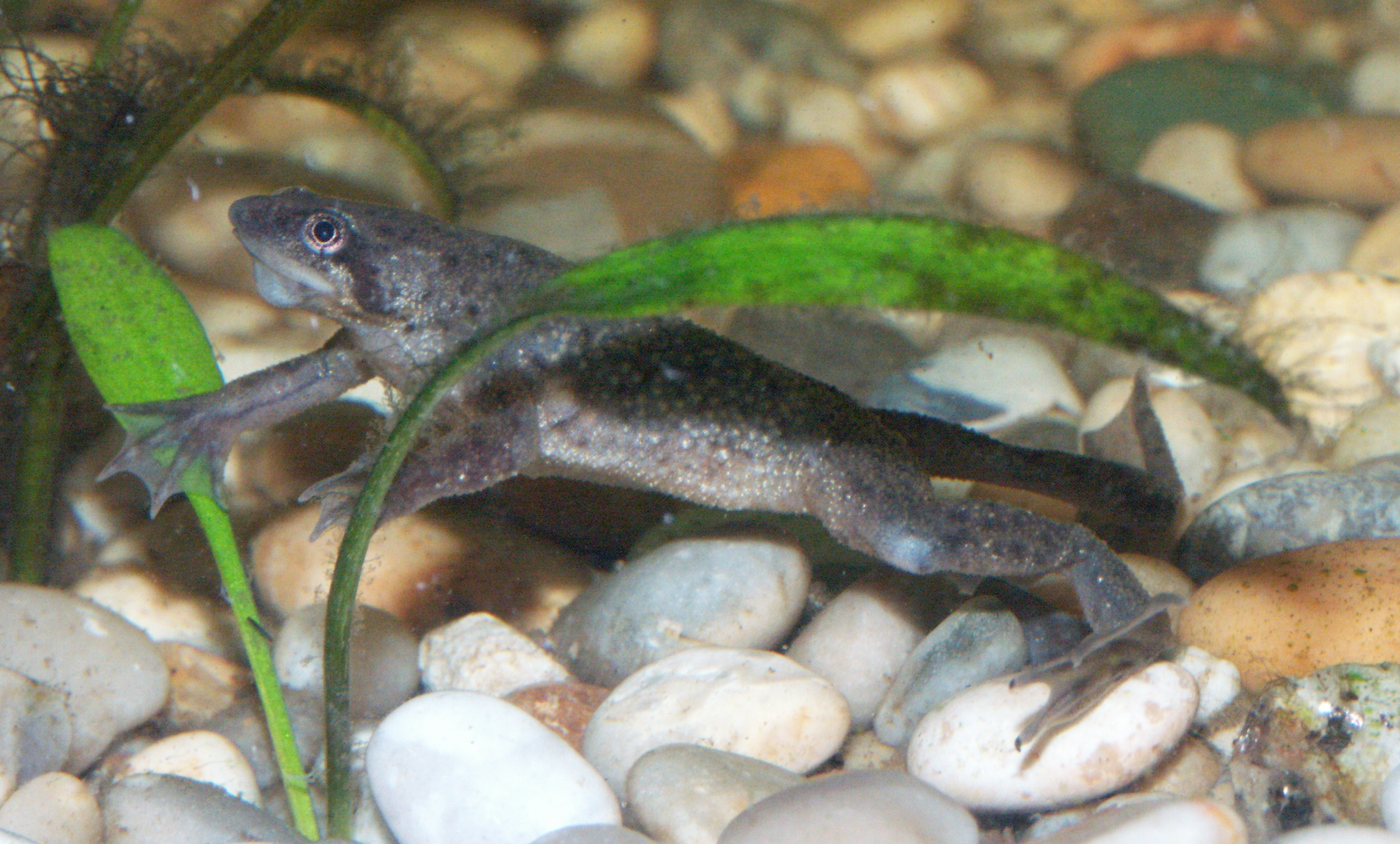
Note the black claws on hind legs

This African frog habitat in the wild consists of shallow rivers, creeks, and ponds during the dry season and the flooded areas of the forests during the wet season. These creatures prefer eating near the bottom where their coloration blends with the mud and leaf litter and they can be safe from predators.

== Mating ==
Males are slim and develop a small gland behind each of their front legs; this gland is not very well understood but is believed to play some part in mating. The gland is a small white spot on both sides, a minor outward bulge on both sides of the frog. Males are known to "sing" or "hum" during mating or when excited, although they sometimes "hum" even if they have no intention of mating. The females of this species are 40% larger than males when fully mature. They have pear-shaped bodies, as their abdomens fill with eggs as they reach a mating stage. Another distinction is the females have a more pronounced genital region, called an ovipositor.

African dwarf frogs mate in amplexus, during which the male grabs the female around the abdomen just in front of its back legs. The female becomes motionless, and its front limbs may twitch sporadically. Amplexus usually happens at night after one or more nights of "humming" by the male. During amplexus, the female swims, laying eggs on the surface of the water, one at a time, whilst towing the male. The female swims to the bottom between layings. The male fertilizes the eggs during this time by releasing sperm into the water. Amplexus can last for several hours. When the female has laid all its eggs, it signals the male once more by going motionless, and after several minutes, the male releases the female and it returns to its normal behavior.
