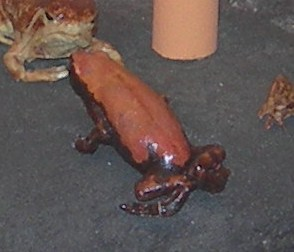
- Phrynomantis microps

Scientific classification
- Domain: Eukaryota
- Kingdom: Animalia
- Phylum: Chordata
- Class: Amphibia
- Order: Anura
- Family: Microhylidae
- Subfamily: Phrynomerinae; Noble, 1931
- Genus: Phrynomantis; Peters, 1867

Species
- 5 species (see text)

= Phrynomantis =

Genus of amphibians

Phrynomantis is a genus of frog in the family Microhylidae. They are also known as rubber frogs, red-marked frogs, red-marked short-headed frogs, and snake-necked frogs. The genus is found in Subsaharan Africa.

== Species ==
The genus has five species.

Binomial name and author	Common name
Phrynomantis affinis Boulenger, 1901	Red-spotted frog, northern red-spotted frog, Pweto snake-necked frog, spotted rubber frog
Phrynomantis annectens Werner, 1910	Marbled rubber frog, red-spotted frog, red-spotted Namibia frog, red marbled frog, Cape snake-necked frog
Phrynomantis bifasciatus (Smith, 1847)	Two-striped frog, red-banded frog, two-banded frog, banded rubber frog, red-banded rubber frog, South African snake-necked frog
Phrynomantis microps Peters, 1875	Accra snake-necked frog, red rubber frog
Phrynomantis somalicus (Scortecci, 1941)	Somali snake-necked frog

Phrynomantis bifasciatus walking on a level surface
