= Hymenochirus curtipes =

Conservation status
- Least Concern (IUCN 3.1)

Scientific classification
- Kingdom: Animalia
- Phylum: Chordata
- Class: Amphibia
- Order: Anura
- Family: Pipidae
- Genus: Hymenochirus
- Species: H. curtipes

Binomial name
- Hymenochirus curtipes Noble, 1924

Species of frog

Hymenochirus curtipes, also known as the western dwarf clawed frog, is a species of frog in the family Pipidae. It is found in the western Democratic Republic of the Congo and adjacent Republic of the Congo. It is likely to occur in the southernmost Central African Republic.

== Description ==
The type series consists of three specimens measuring 24–28 mm (0.9–1.1 in) in snout–vent length; the smallest one is the holotype, an adult male. Females can reach at least 33 mm (1.3 in) in snout–vent length. The head is narrow and flat, and the eyes point almost directly upward. No tympanum is visible. The legs are short compared to other Hymenochirus. The fingers are half-webbed, whereas the toes are completely webbed, with the webbing scarcely indented. Skin is coarsely and uniformly tubercular. The body is muddy brown above with indistinct dark brown spotting that becomes distinct below.

== Habitat and conservation ==
Hymenochirus curtipes is presumably ecologically similar to Hymenochirus boettgeri, an aquatic frog that occurs in still, shaded water in lowland rainforest and in pools by slow-flowing rivers. Two individuals in amplexus have been reported in a flooded forest. No significant threats to this species are known; although it is collected for the pet trade, this is not considered a threat.

== As pets ==
Hymenochirus curtipes are kept as pets. Former London mayor Ken Livingstone was the first person in the world to breed H. curtipes in captivity.
