= Hymenochirus boulengeri =

Conservation status
- Data Deficient (IUCN 3.1)

Scientific classification
- Kingdom: Animalia
- Phylum: Chordata
- Class: Amphibia
- Order: Anura
- Family: Pipidae
- Genus: Hymenochirus
- Species: H. boulengeri

Binomial name
- Hymenochirus boulengeri De Witte, 1930

Species of frog

Hymenochirus boulengeri, also known as eastern dwarf clawed frog, is a species of frog in the family Pipidae. It is endemic to northeastern Democratic Republic of the Congo where it is only known from two localities. It is presumably ecologically similar to Hymenochirus boettgeri, an aquatic frog that occurs in still, shaded water in lowland rainforest, and in pools by slow-flowing rivers. Threats to this little-known species are unknown.
