= Hyperolius dintelmanni =

Conservation status
- Endangered (IUCN 3.1)

Scientific classification
- Kingdom: Animalia
- Phylum: Chordata
- Class: Amphibia
- Order: Anura
- Family: Hyperoliidae
- Genus: Hyperolius
- Species: H. dintelmanni

Binomial name
- Hyperolius dintelmanni Lötters and Schmitz, 2004

Synonyms
- Hyperolius tuberculatus dintelmanni — Amiet, 2012

Species of amphibian

Hyperolius dintelmanni is a species of frogs in the family Hyperoliidae. It is endemic to Cameroon and found in the montane southwestern part of the country. Specifically, it has been recorded from the Bakossi Mountains, including the Edib Hills (its type locality) and Mount Kupe. The specific name, dintelmanni, honors Mr. Horst Dintelmann from Germany in recognition of "his support of taxonomic research and forthcoming conservation projects in Cameroon".

== Taxonomy and systematics ==
Hyperolius dintelmanni belongs to the so-called Hyperolius tuberculatus complex, which includes Hyperolius hutsebauti as the third species. Distinctness of H. dintelmanni from H. tuberculatus has been questioned, but molecular data now clearly supports recognizing H. dintelmanni as a distinct species.

== Description ==
Adult males in the type series measure 30–34 mm (1.2–1.3 in) and adult females 27–30 mm (1.1–1.2 in) in snout–vent length (SVL); Portik and colleagues report a larger size range for females, 31–36 mm (1.2–1.4 in) SVL, including specimens from the type locality as well as from Mount Kupe. The body is slender. The snout is rounded. The tympanum is visible in most specimens even though the tympanic membrane is covered by thick skin. The fingers and the toes have broad tips and are webbed, the toes more so than the fingers. The phase J males are dorsally olive green to translucent dark green on extremities with light green patterns that turns yellowish towards the periphery. The venter varies from yellowish to greyish in the gular region. Phase F individuals are dorsally dark brown to black and have greenish spotting and bright red areas on upper legs, feet, and hands. The lower legs and feet and hands are almost entirely bright red. The ventrum is yellowish. However, Portik and colleagues describe phase F individuals as having a smaller number of reddish-pink points on the dorsum, whereas the ventral colouration is bright reddish-pink; they suggest that the females in the original species description are misidentified. The iris is bronze.

== Habitat and conservation ==
Hyperolius dintelmanni is known from a few localities at elevations of 470–1,250 m (1,540–4,100 ft) above sea level. The Edib Hills specimens were found on the outer margins of patches of primary forest. The breeding habitat consisted of a small crater lake. Specimens were found sitting low (<1 m above the ground) at night in grassy vegetation in areas with ferns, or further inland along the forest trails. Breeding individuals were found on floating mats of vegetation the pond edge. Mount Kupe specimens were found calling from emergent vegetation of a fish pond adjacent to a large stream; some specimens were found at a pond located in semi-disturbed habitat consisting of primary forest and cocoa plantation.

This species appears to tolerate some habitat disturbance, but densities were much higher at the undisturbed site (the Edib Hills crater lake) than in the modified habitats. The species is unlikely to persist in areas where extensive forest clearance for smallholder farming is taking place.
