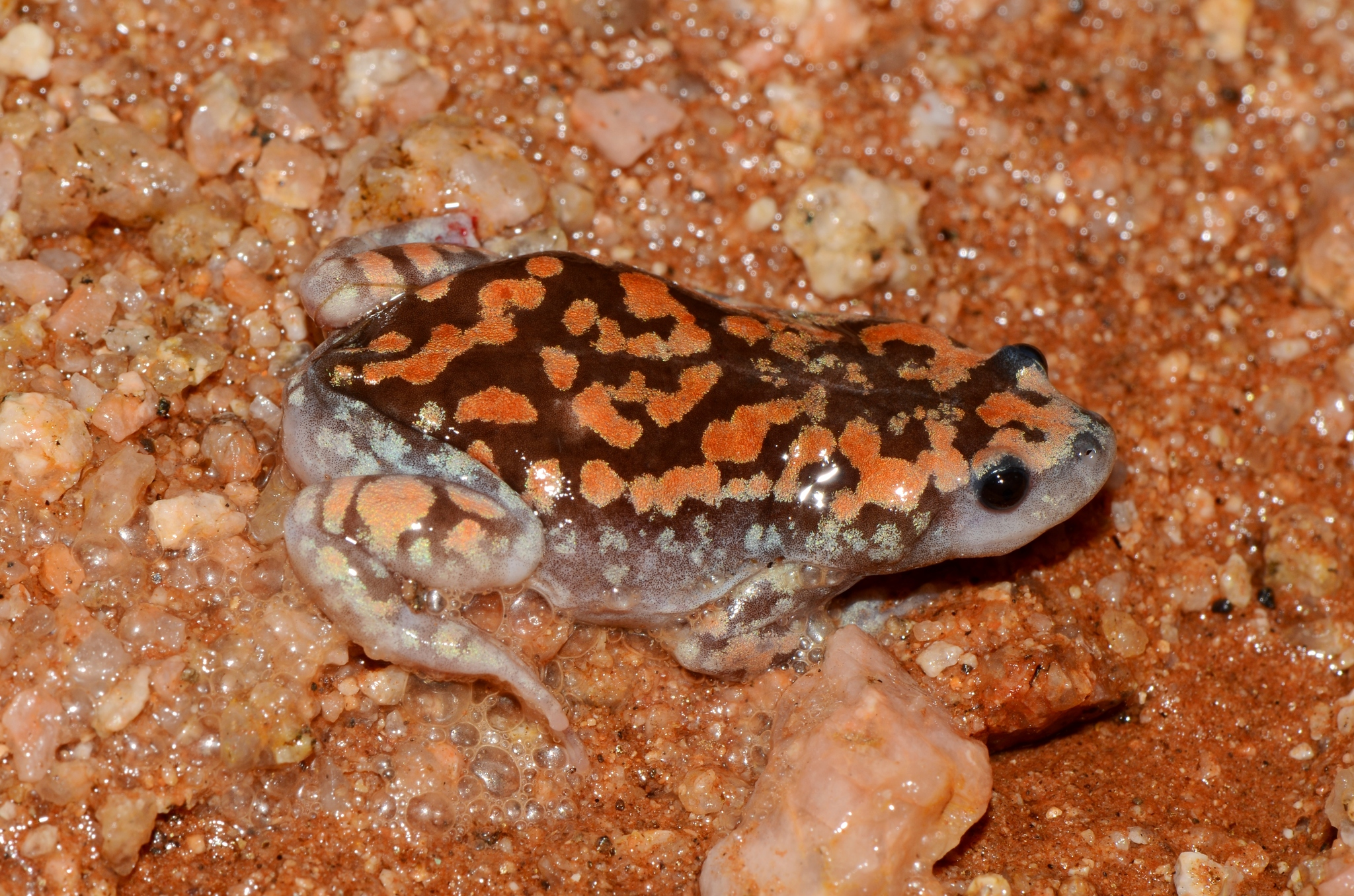

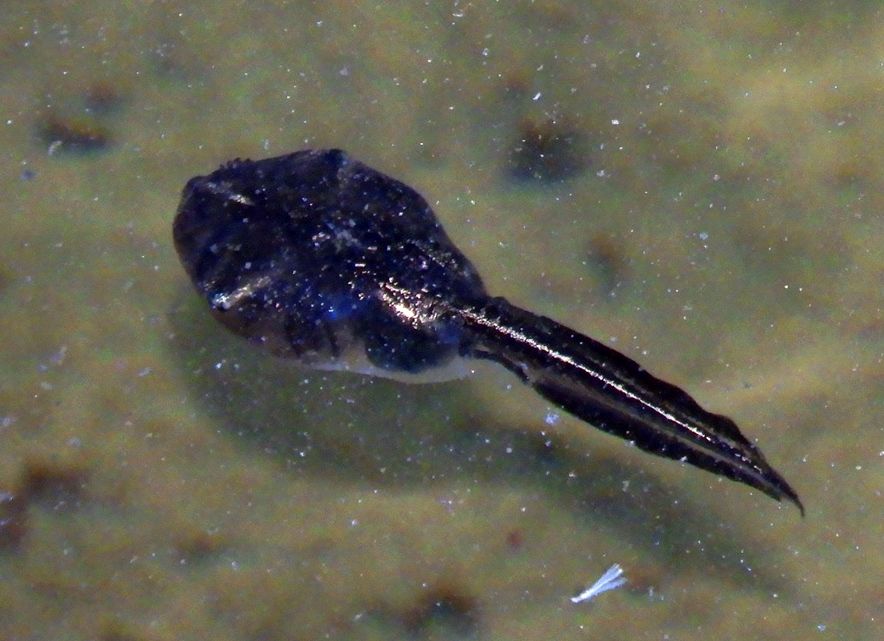
- adult and tadpole

Conservation status
- Least Concern (IUCN 3.1)

Scientific classification
- Kingdom: Animalia
- Phylum: Chordata
- Class: Amphibia
- Order: Anura
- Family: Microhylidae
- Genus: Phrynomantis
- Species: P. annectens

Binomial name
- Phrynomantis annectens Werner, 1910

= Marbled rubber frog =

Species of amphibian

The marbled rubber frog (Phrynomantis annectens) is a species of frog in the family Microhylidae. It is native to Angola, Namibia, and South Africa.

Its natural habitats are dry savanna, subtropical or tropical dry shrubland, intermittent freshwater marshes, hot deserts, and temperate desert. Its survival often depends on finding deeper pools in inselbergs and other rocky formations.

The species is threatened by habitat loss.

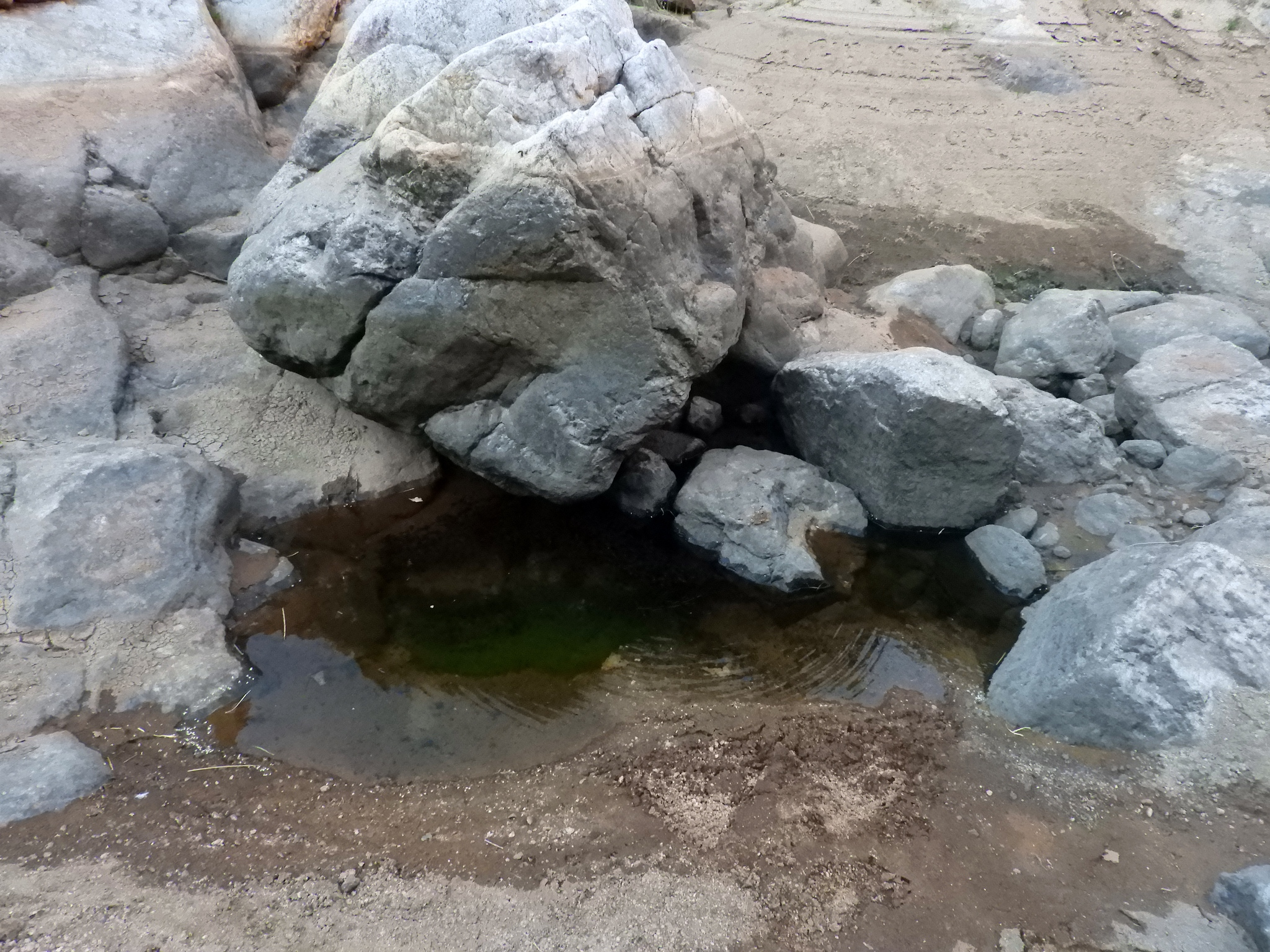
Breeding habitat near Aggeneys, Northern Cape
