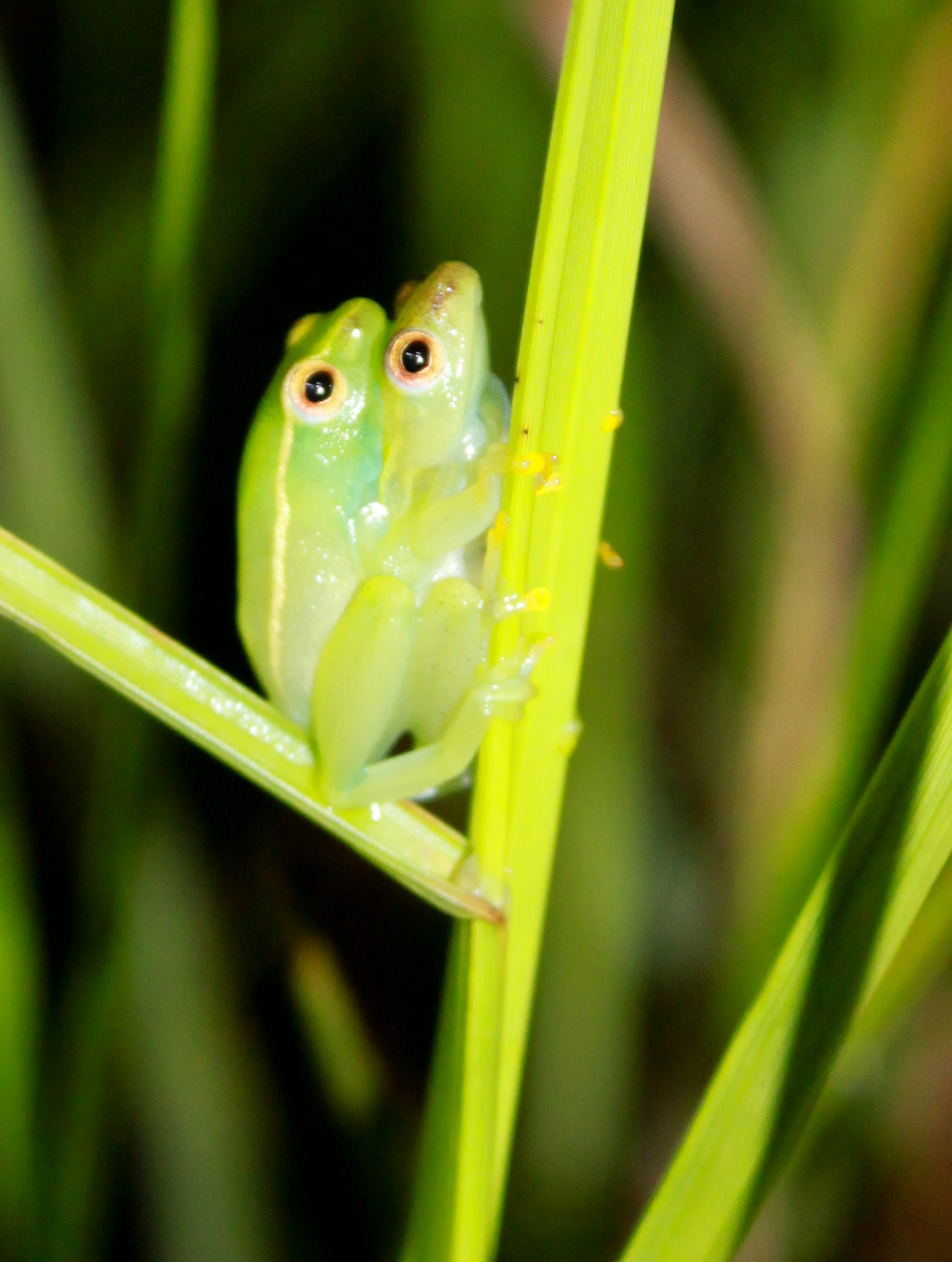

Conservation status
- Least Concern (IUCN 3.1)

Scientific classification
- Kingdom: Animalia
- Phylum: Chordata
- Class: Amphibia
- Order: Anura
- Family: Hyperoliidae
- Genus: Hyperolius
- Species: H. nasutus

Binomial name
- Hyperolius nasutus Günther, 1865

Synonyms
- Rappia nasuta (Günther, 1865); Rappia punctulata Bocage, 1895; Hyperolius punctulatus (Bocage, 1895)

= Hyperolius nasutus =

Species of frog

Hyperolius nasutus is a species of frog in the family Hyperoliidae. Common names include long-nosed reed frog, sharp-nosed reed frog and long reed frog. It is known from northern Angola and northern Botswana (Okavango Delta), but it presumably occurs more widely (including the intervening Namibia). The nominal Hyperolius nasutus was partitioned in 2013 into three cryptic species, the other two being Hyperolius viridis and Hyperolius microps (formerly Hyperolius acuticeps). All these species are members of the so-called Hyperolius nasutus species group, the "long reed frogs".

== Description ==
A "representative" adult male measures 17 mm (0.67 in) in snout–urostyle length. The snout is rounded. There is no externally visible tympanum. The body is long and slender. The limbs are slender. The fingers and toes are webbed and broad, rounded discs (smaller on the toes). The dorsum is light green with more or less translucent skin. The limbs are green and sides of the snout and area above eyes are reddish brown. The back is covered small and large dark spots. A moderately broad dorso-lateral stripe runs along each side of the body. The iris is reddish brown. Males have single median vocal sac that is pale yellow in colour and triangular in shape.

The male advertisement call is a "buzz" of eight pulses and has a duration of 0.1 seconds.

== Habitat and conservation ==
Hyperolius nasutus is found at the margins of swamps, rivers, and lakes in savanna and grassland habitats. It is associated with emergent vegetation and sedges. It can also be found near human settlements. It is a common species and no significantly threats to it are known. Furthermore, it occurs in some protected areas.
