= Phrynomantis somalicus =

Conservation status
- Least Concern (IUCN 3.1)

Scientific classification
- Kingdom: Animalia
- Phylum: Chordata
- Class: Amphibia
- Order: Anura
- Family: Microhylidae
- Genus: Phrynomantis
- Species: P. somalicus

Binomial name
- Phrynomantis somalicus (Scortecci, 1941)

Synonyms
- Fichteria somalica Scortecci, 1941; Phrynomerus bifasciatus somalicus — Laurent in Gans, Laurent, and Pandit, 1965

Species of amphibian

Phrynomantis somalicus, also known as Somali rubber frog or Somali snake-necked frog, is a species of frog in the family Microhylidae. It is known from southern Ethiopia and southern Somalia. Its total distribution is poorly known and might extend into Kenya.

This species is probably an inhabitant of open dry savannas and dry grasslands. The Ethiopian record is from riverine Acacia woodland in an arid savanna region. Breeding probably takes place in temporary pools and pans, where at other times, these frogs are assumed to live in subterranean cavities near water. Specific threats to it are unknown, but it is likely suffering from environmental degradation caused by human settlement and expansion, and the associated increased populations of domestic livestock. It is not known to occur in any protected areas.
