= Sclerophrys kisoloensis =

Conservation status
- Least Concern (IUCN 3.1)

Scientific classification
- Kingdom: Animalia
- Phylum: Chordata
- Class: Amphibia
- Order: Anura
- Family: Bufonidae
- Genus: Sclerophrys
- Species: S. kisoloensis

Binomial name
- Sclerophrys kisoloensis (Loveridge, 1932)

Synonyms
- Bufo regularis kisoloensis Loveridge, 1932; Bufo kisoloensis Loveridge, 1932; Amietophrynus kisoloensis (Loveridge, 1932)

Species of amphibian

Sclerophrys kisoloensis is a species of toad in the family Bufonidae. It is found in southwestern Kenya, Uganda, Rwanda, eastern Democratic Republic of the Congo, northeastern Zambia, western Tanzania, and (pending confirmation) northern Malawi. It probably also occurs in Burundi. Common names Kisolo toad and montane golden toad have been coined for it.

Sclerophrys kisoloensis occurs in mature, undisturbed montane forests at elevations of 1,500–3,000 m (4,900–9,800 ft) above sea level, possibly wider. Breeding takes place in pools and slow streams. It is a rarely encountered species in most of its range. It can be threatened by habitat loss caused particularly by agriculture and wood extraction.
