= Sclerophrys lemairii =

Conservation status
- Least Concern (IUCN 3.1)

Scientific classification
- Kingdom: Animalia
- Phylum: Chordata
- Class: Amphibia
- Order: Anura
- Family: Bufonidae
- Genus: Sclerophrys
- Species: S. lemairii

Binomial name
- Sclerophrys lemairii (Boulenger, 1901)

Synonyms
- Amietophrynus lemairii; Bufo lemairii

Species of amphibian

Sclerophrys lemairii is a species of toad in the family Bufonidae. It is found in Angola, Botswana, Republic of the Congo, Democratic Republic of the Congo, Namibia, and Zambia. Its natural habitats are dry savanna, moist savanna, subtropical or tropical dry lowland grassland, subtropical or tropical seasonally wet or flooded lowland grassland, swamps, and freshwater marshes. It is threatened by habitat loss.
