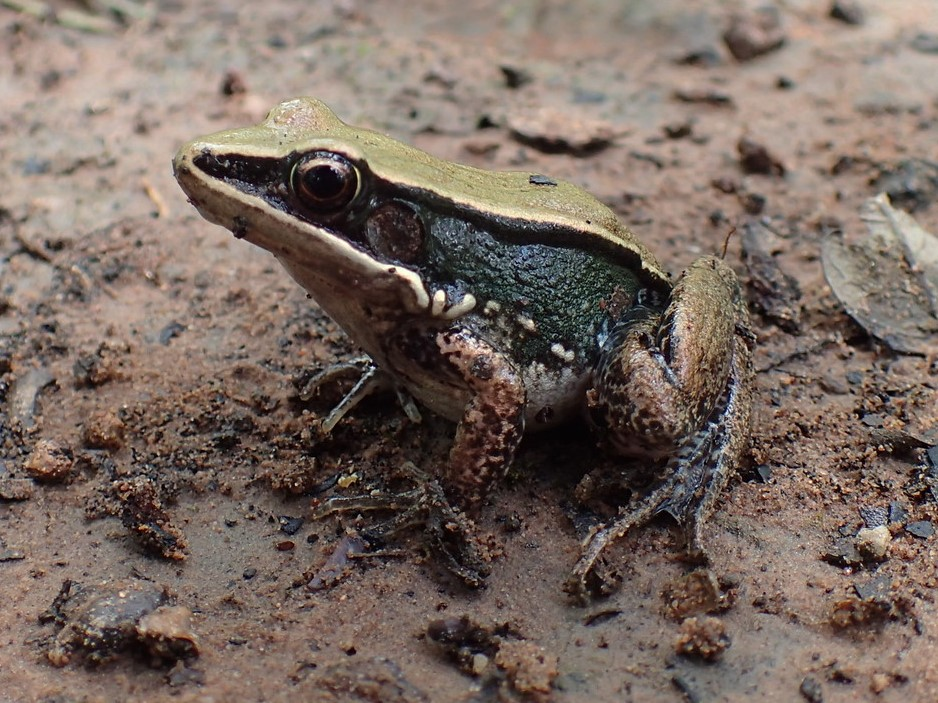

Conservation status
- Least Concern (IUCN 3.1)

Scientific classification
- Kingdom: Animalia
- Phylum: Chordata
- Class: Amphibia
- Order: Anura
- Family: Ranidae
- Genus: Amnirana
- Species: A. darlingi

Binomial name
- Amnirana darlingi (Boulenger, 1902)

Synonyms
- Rana darlingi Boulenger, 1902; Hylarana darlingi (Boulenger, 1902); Amnirana darlingi (Boulenger, 1902); Rana albolabris adiscifera Schmidt and Inger, 1959

= Amnirana darlingi =

Species of amphibian

Amnirana darlingi, commonly known as Darling's golden-backed frog, is a species of frogs in the family Ranidae. It is found in eastern Angola, the Caprivi Strip of Namibia, extreme northern Botswana, extreme southern Democratic Republic of the Congo, Zambia (but for the northeast), eastern and northern Zimbabwe, southern Malawi, and west-central Mozambique.

Its natural habitats are subtropical or tropical dry forests, subtropical or tropical moist lowland forests, moist savanna, subtropical or tropical moist shrubland, subtropical or tropical seasonally wet or flooded lowland grassland, rivers, swamps, freshwater lakes, freshwater marshes, arable land, pastureland, water storage areas, and ponds.

== Conservation ==
Significant pressures are present from an expanding human population of the region, particularly due to conversion of habitat to agriculture, extraction of river water for human consumption, and widespread slash-and-burn practises. According to C. Michael Hogan: "While the population for H. darlingi may be secure for the present, the threat accretion trends place a significant pressure upon the habitat itself, as well as the fragmentation of habitat."
