= Hyperolius discodactylus =

Conservation status
- Least Concern (IUCN 3.1)

Scientific classification
- Kingdom: Animalia
- Phylum: Chordata
- Class: Amphibia
- Order: Anura
- Family: Hyperoliidae
- Genus: Hyperolius
- Species: H. discodactylus

Binomial name
- Hyperolius discodactylus Ahl, 1931

Synonyms
- Hyperolius alticola Ahl, 1931

Species of amphibian

Hyperolius discodactylus is a species of frogs in the family Hyperoliidae. It occurs in the montane areas of eastern Democratic Republic of the Congo and western Uganda, Rwanda, and Burundi. It is also known as the Albertine Rift reed frog, highland reed frog, or disc-fingered reed frog.

== Description ==
Adult males measure 27–35 mm (1.1–1.4 in) and adult females 30–39 mm (1.2–1.5 in) in snout–urostyle length. The fingers bear large discs and are up to half-webbed. The toes have somewhat smaller discs and are about half-webbed. The dorsum is brownish to orange, either uniform or displaying diffuse dark spots. A dark canthal line is present. Calling males have bright green vocal sac. The venter is bright orange.

== Habitat and conservation ==
Hyperolius discodactylus occurs in montane forests at elevations of 1,600–2,700 m (5,200–8,900 ft) above sea level. It is associated with rivers, streams, and swamps, its presumed breeding habitat.

It is mostly a rarely encountered species. Precise information is lacking but it might be threatened by habitat loss caused by agriculture, wood extraction, and human settlements. However, it is present in a number of protected areas: Bwindi and Ruwenzori Mountains National Parks in Uganda, Nyungwe National Park in Rwanda, Bururi Nature Reserve in Burundi, and Kahuzi-Biega and Virunga National Parks in the Democratic Republic of Congo.
