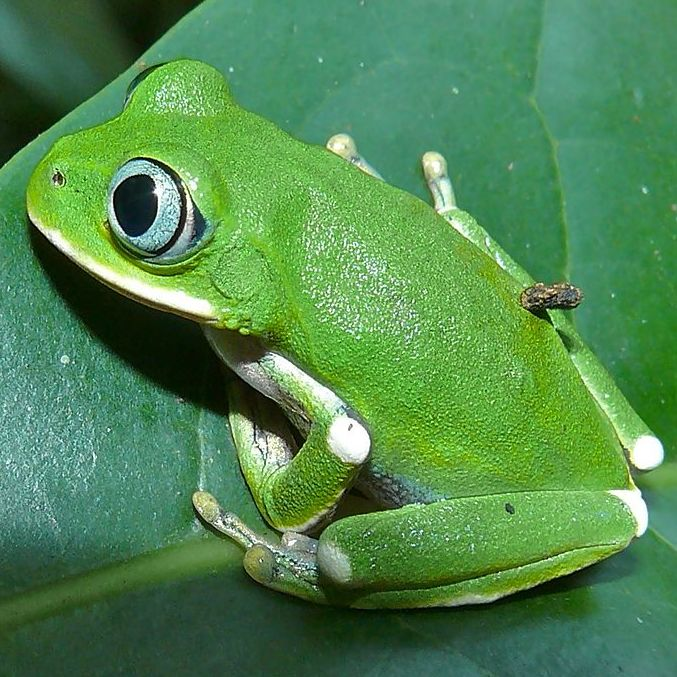

Conservation status
- Least Concern (IUCN 3.1)

Scientific classification
- Kingdom: Animalia
- Phylum: Chordata
- Class: Amphibia
- Order: Anura
- Family: Arthroleptidae
- Genus: Leptopelis
- Species: L. kivuensis

Binomial name
- Leptopelis kivuensis Ahl, 1929

Synonyms
- Leptopelis graueri Ahl, 1929; Leptopelis rugegensis Ahl, 1929

= Leptopelis kivuensis =

Species of amphibian

Leptopelis kivuensis is a species of frog in the family Arthroleptidae. It is found in the highlands of western Burundi, Rwanda, and Uganda, and in the extreme eastern Democratic Republic of the Congo. It has been considered synonym of Leptopelis karissimbensis, and has been confused with that species. Common names Kisenyi forest treefrog and Kivu tree frog have been coined for it.

== Description ==
Adult males measure 28–37 mm (1.1–1.5 in) in snout–vent length. The tympanum is small. The fingers and toes have reduced webbing. Dorsal coloration is variable and adult males may be tan, reddish-brown, or light green. Some tan or brown individuals bear light brown triangular patterns between the eyes and sacrum, an irregular dark brown line running from the canthus rostralis through the eye and over the tympanum and to the forelimb, dark brown spots on the flanks, and dark brown crossbars on the upper side of the limbs. A white or cream spot under the eye may be present, albeit being indistinct. Males have a white gular vocal sac.

The male advertisement call is a pulsed, single clack repeated in rapid succession. Double clacks are also possible.

== Habitat and conservation ==
Leptopelis kivuensis is associated with forests at elevations of 1,481–2,600 m (4,859–8,530 ft) above sea level. It occurs in montane wetlands and forest ecotones. Breeding takes place in seasonally flooded swamp forests. The eggs are buried in nests in the ground. The onset of heavy rains causes the eggs to hatch, and the flooding washes the tadpoles into water.

This species is probably affected by habitat loss caused by agriculture, wood extraction, and human settlements. However, much of its range is within national parks: Kahuzi-Biega and Virunga National Parks in the Democratic Republic of Congo, Rwenzori Mountains, Kibale, and Bwindi National Parks in Uganda, and Nyungwe National Park in Rwanda.
