= Spotted rubber frog =

Conservation status
- Least Concern (IUCN 3.1)

Scientific classification
- Kingdom: Animalia
- Phylum: Chordata
- Class: Amphibia
- Order: Anura
- Family: Microhylidae
- Genus: Phrynomantis
- Species: P. affinis

Binomial name
- Phrynomantis affinis Boulenger, 1901

Species of amphibian

The spotted rubber frog (Phrynomantis affinis) is a species of frog in the family Microhylidae. It is found in Angola, Democratic Republic of the Congo, Namibia, Zambia, possibly Botswana, possibly Tanzania, and possibly Zimbabwe. Its natural habitats are dry savanna, moist savanna, subtropical or tropical dry shrubland, intermittent freshwater lakes, and intermittent freshwater marshes.
