= Mertensophryne schmidti =

Conservation status
- Data Deficient (IUCN 3.1)

Scientific classification
- Kingdom: Animalia
- Phylum: Chordata
- Class: Amphibia
- Order: Anura
- Family: Bufonidae
- Genus: Mertensophryne
- Species: M. schmidti

Binomial name
- Mertensophryne schmidti Grandison, 1972

Synonyms
- Bufo schmidti (Grandison, 1972)

Species of amphibian

Mertensophryne schmidti (commonly known as Schmidt's snouted frog) is a species of toad in the family Bufonidae. It is endemic to Democratic Republic of the Congo and only known from the Upemba National Park.

A poorly known species, it is assumed to be a Miombo savanna inhabitant.

Threats to it are unknown. It is named after Karl Patterson Schmidt, American herpetologist.
