= Sclerophrys fuliginata =

Conservation status
- Least Concern (IUCN 3.1)

Scientific classification
- Kingdom: Animalia
- Phylum: Chordata
- Class: Amphibia
- Order: Anura
- Family: Bufonidae
- Genus: Sclerophrys
- Species: S. fuliginata

Binomial name
- Sclerophrys fuliginata (de Witte, 1932)

Synonyms
- Bufo fuliginatus de Witte, 1932; Bufo funereus upembae Schmidt and Inger, 1959; Bufo funereus fuliginatus —Laurent, 1964; Amietophrynus fuliginatus (de Witte, 1932)

Species of amphibian

Sclerophrys fuliginata is a species of toad in the family Bufonidae. The specific name fuliginata is Latin for "sooty", in reference to the species' appearance of a more or less diffusely uniform exterior color and pattern. It is also known as the Shaba Province toad or sooty toad. It is found in the southern Democratic Republic of the Congo, southeastern Tanzania, and northern Zambia.

== Description ==
Adult females can reach 65 mm (2.6 in) in snout–vent length. Males reach sexual maturity at about 40 mm (1.6 in) in snout–vent length. The tympanum is discernible, but the tympanic annulus tends to be covered by spinose warts. The parotoid glands are prominent and covered by dark-tipped spines, except in males in full breeding condition. The toes are almost fully webbed. Skin, especially the limbs, are particularly spinose, but less so in breeding males. Coloration is an almost uniform hue, without a pronounced patterning.

== Habitat and conservation ==
Sclerophrys fuliginata occurs in montane forests and gallery forests and on forest edges at elevations above 1,880 m (6,170 ft). Breeding biology is not known but probably involves aquatic tadpoles.

This species is known from isolated records over a wide area. Specific threats to it are unknown, but it is likely to be affected by forest loss caused by agriculture, livestock grazing, human settlements, and fire. It is present in the Upemba National Park in the Democratic Republic of Congo, and probably in other protected areas.
