= Hyperolius hutsebauti =

Conservation status
- Least Concern (IUCN 3.1)

Scientific classification
- Kingdom: Animalia
- Phylum: Chordata
- Class: Amphibia
- Order: Anura
- Family: Hyperoliidae
- Genus: Hyperolius
- Species: H. hutsebauti

Binomial name
- Hyperolius hutsebauti Laurent, 1956

Synonyms
- Hyperolius tuberculatus hutsebauti Laurent, 1956

Species of frog

Hyperolius hutsebauti is a species of frog in the family Hyperoliidae. It is found widely in the eastern Democratic Republic of the Congo and has recently (2016) been recorded in Burundi. The specific name hutsebauti honours Franz Joseph Hutsebaut (1886–1954), a Catholic missionary in what was then Belgian Congo. Common names Ibembo reed frog and Hutsebaut's reed frog have been coined for it.

== Taxonomy and systematics ==
Hyperolius hutsebauti was first described as a subspecies of Hyperolius tuberculatus. It is now recognized as a distinct species within the so-called Hyperolius tuberculatus complex, which includes Hyperolius dintelmanni as the third species.

== Description ==
Males grow to 32 mm (1.3 in) and females to 36 mm (1.4 in) in snout–vent length. Hyperolius hutsebauti is similar to Hyperolius tuberculatus but phase F ("female phase") has diffuse darker marbling on a light ground colour. The pupil is horizontal.

== Habitat and conservation ==
Hyperolius hutsebauti occurs in savanna and degraded forests as well as at the edges of villages in modified haitats (e.g., artificial fish ponds and flooded cow pastures) at elevations of 414–2,030 m (1,358–6,660 ft) above sea level. It is a widespread and locally abundant species that is unlikely to be facing significant threats.
