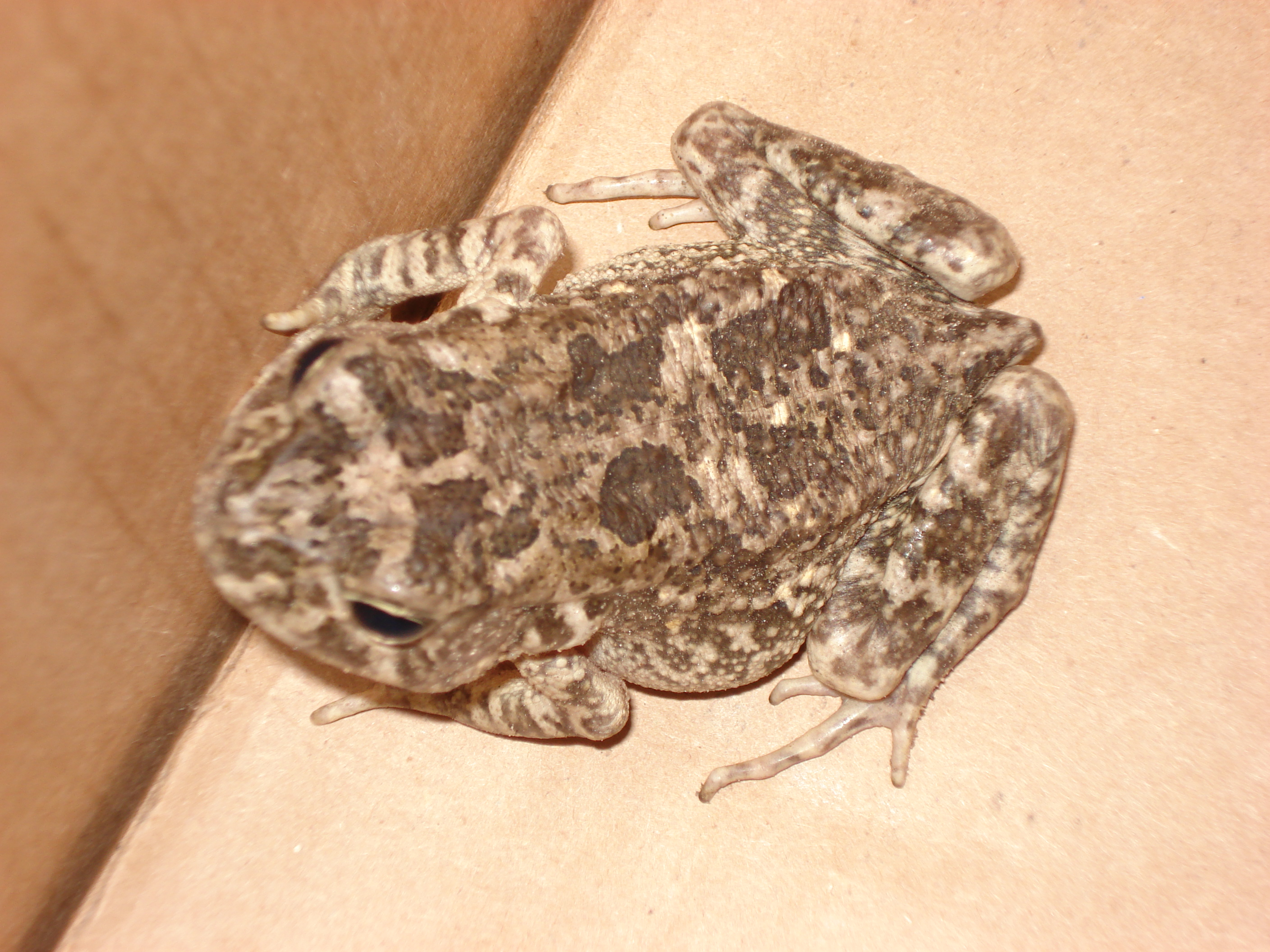

Conservation status
- Least Concern (IUCN 3.1)

Scientific classification
- Kingdom: Animalia
- Phylum: Chordata
- Class: Amphibia
- Order: Anura
- Family: Bufonidae
- Genus: Sclerophrys
- Species: S. maculata

Binomial name
- Sclerophrys maculata (Hallowell, 1855)

Synonyms
- Amietophrynus maculatus; Bufo maculatus

= Sclerophrys maculata =

Species of amphibian

Sclerophrys maculata — commonly known as Hallowell's toad, the flat-backed toad, and the striped toad — is an African member of Bufonidae, the true toad family.

== Habitat ==
Natural habitats of S. maculata include subtropical or tropical moist lowland forests, subtropical or tropical moist montane forests, dry savanna, moist savanna, subtropical or tropical dry shrubland, subtropical or tropical dry lowland grassland, rivers, intermittent freshwater marshes, ponds, and canals and ditches. It is threatened by habitat loss.

== Range ==
S. maculata is found in Angola, Benin, Botswana, Burkina Faso, Cameroon, Central African Republic, Republic of the Congo, Democratic Republic of the Congo, Ivory Coast, Eswatini, Ethiopia, Gabon, Ghana, Guinea, Kenya, Liberia, Malawi, Mozambique, Namibia, Nigeria, Sierra Leone, South Africa, Tanzania, Uganda, Zambia, and Zimbabwe. Further work is required, but it is possible that its range also includes Burundi, Chad, Equatorial Guinea, Mali, Rwanda, Sudan, and Togo.

== Sources ==
- Tandy, M., Rödel, M.-O., Channing, A., Howell, K., Minter, L., Poynton, J.C. & Largen, M. 2004. Bufo maculatus. 2006 IUCN Red List of Threatened Species. Downloaded on 21 July 2007.
