= Mertensophryne melanopleura =

Conservation status
- Least Concern (IUCN 3.1)

Scientific classification
- Kingdom: Animalia
- Phylum: Chordata
- Class: Amphibia
- Order: Anura
- Family: Bufonidae
- Genus: Mertensophryne
- Species: M. melanopleura

Binomial name
- Mertensophryne melanopleura (Schmidt and Inger, 1959)

Synonyms
- Bufo melanopleura Schmidt and Inger, 1959

Species of amphibian

Mertensophryne melanopleura (common names: Kankunde toad, dark-sided toad) is a species of toad in the family Bufonidae. It is known from its type locality, the Upemba National Park in southern Democratic Republic of the Congo, and from eastern Angola and south of Ndola in northern Zambia.

== Description ==
Adult males measure 18–21 mm (0.7–0.8 in) and adult females 20–25 mm (0.8–1.0 in) in snout–vent length. The overall appearance is moderately slender. The snout is truncate. Neither tympanum nor cranial crests are present. The parotoid gland is elongate but feebly distinct. The legs are short. The finger and the toe tips are bluntly rounded. The toes have basal webbing whereas the fingers are unwebbed. Dorsal skin and the sides of the head have dense cover of flattened, round warts. The lower parts are coarsely granular. Preserved specimens are brown above, or light brown market with pairs of dark-brown bars. The flanks are blackish brown. The venter is whitish or cream, with dark mark that varies in extent a narrow median stripe to covering nearly half of the ventral surfaces. Adult males have nuptial pads but no vocal sac.

The eggs are relatively large (1.8–2 mm (0.071–0.079 in) in diameter) but few in number (31 and 35 in two females).

== Habitat and conservation ==
This rarely encountered species seems to prefer gallery forests and woodland; reproduction takes place in water. Most Upemba specimens were collected from about 1,300 m (4,300 ft) above sea level. Its habitats are believed not to face major threats. It occurs in Upemba National Park, Democratic Republic of Congo.
