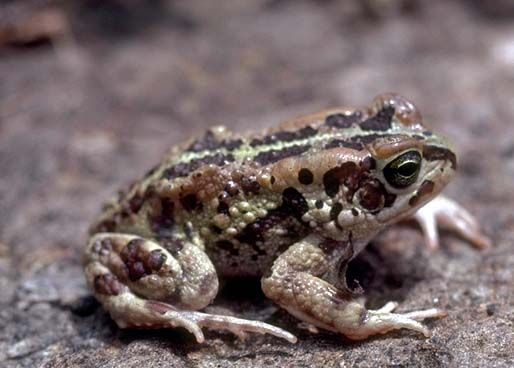

Conservation status
- Data Deficient (IUCN 3.1)

Scientific classification
- Kingdom: Animalia
- Phylum: Chordata
- Class: Amphibia
- Order: Anura
- Family: Bufonidae
- Genus: Sclerophrys
- Species: S. buchneri

Binomial name
- Sclerophrys buchneri (Peters, 1882)

Synonyms
- Bufo buchneri Peters, 1882; Bufo Decorsei Mocquard, 1903; Amietophrynus buchneri (Peters, 1882)

= Sclerophrys buchneri =

Species of amphibian

Sclerophrys buchneri, also known as Buchner's toad, is a species of toad in the family Bufonidae. It is found in the Cabinda Province of Angola and western Republic of the Congo, presumably also in Democratic Republic of the Congo. The biology of this species is essentially unknown. It might even be synonym of Sclerophrys funereus.
