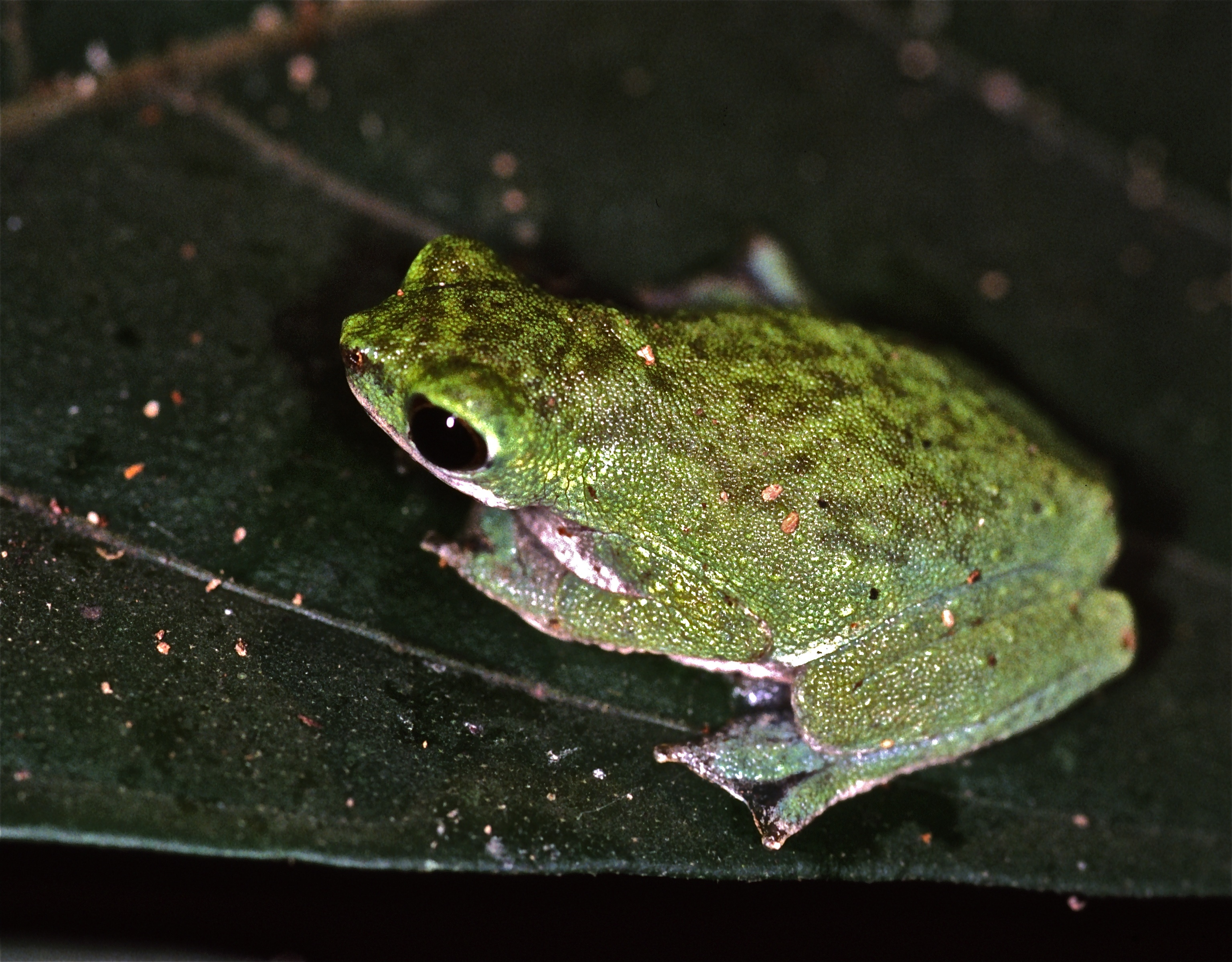

Conservation status
- Least Concern (IUCN 3.1)

Scientific classification
- Kingdom: Animalia
- Phylum: Chordata
- Class: Amphibia
- Order: Anura
- Family: Bufonidae
- Genus: Nectophryne
- Species: N. afra

Binomial name
- Nectophryne afra Buchholz & Peters, 1875

= African tree toad =

Species of amphibian

The African tree toad (Nectophryne afra) is a species of toad in the family Bufonidae. It is found in the West and Central Africa from southwestern Nigeria through Cameroon to Equatorial Guinea (including Bioko), Gabon, and northeastern Democratic Republic of the Congo.

Morphologically, Nectophryne afra is very similar to Nectorphryne batesii except in their snouts and extremities. The snout of N. afra protrudes further and has a light colored line that connects the medial cleft to the upper lip: this is seen less in older specimen. N. afra limbs are also notably shorter than N. batesii.

African tree toads inhabit lowland forests. They are terrestrial by day and climb to vegetation by night. The male guards eggs that the pair lays in tree cavities containing water.

The species can suffer locally from habitat loss. It is present in a number of national parks, including the Korup National Park, Monte Alén National Park, and Virunga National Park.The African tree toad is a species of toad in the family Bufonidae.
