= Sclerophrys latifrons =

Conservation status
- Least Concern (IUCN 3.1)

Scientific classification
- Kingdom: Animalia
- Phylum: Chordata
- Class: Amphibia
- Order: Anura
- Family: Bufonidae
- Genus: Sclerophrys
- Species: S. latifrons

Binomial name
- Sclerophrys latifrons (Boulenger, 1900)

Synonyms
- Amietophrynus latifrons Boulenger, 1900; Bufo latifrons Boulenger, 1900

Species of amphibian

Sclerophrys latifrons is a species of toad in the family Bufonidae. It is found in Cameroon, Republic of the Congo, Democratic Republic of the Congo, Equatorial Guinea, Gabon, possibly Angola, and possibly Nigeria. Its natural habitats are subtropical or tropical moist lowland forests and subtropical or tropical moist montane forests. It is threatened by habitat loss.
