= Sclerophrys steindachneri =

Conservation status
- Least Concern (IUCN 3.1)

Scientific classification
- Kingdom: Animalia
- Phylum: Chordata
- Class: Amphibia
- Order: Anura
- Family: Bufonidae
- Genus: Sclerophrys
- Species: S. steindachneri

Binomial name
- Sclerophrys steindachneri (Pfeffer, 1893)

Synonyms
- Bufo steindachnerii Pfeffer, 1893; Amietophrynus steindachneri (Pfeffer, 1893)

Species of amphibian

Sclerophrys steindachneri is a species of toad in the family Bufonidae. The species is native to central Africa.

== Etymology ==
The specific name, steindachneri, is in honor of Viennese zoologist Franz Steindachner.

== Geographic range ==
Sclerophrys steindachneri is found in Cameroon, Central African Republic, Chad, Democratic Republic of the Congo, Ethiopia, Kenya, Nigeria, Somalia, Sudan, Tanzania, and Uganda.

== Habitat ==
The natural habitats of Sclerophrys steindachneri are subtropical or tropical moist lowland forests, moist savanna, subtropical or tropical moist shrubland, subtropical or tropical seasonally wet or flooded lowland grassland, swamps, freshwater marshes, intermittent freshwater marshes, but it is also found in artificial habitats such as plantations, rural gardens, urban areas, ponds, canals and ditches.

== Conservation status ==
Sclerophrys steindachneri is threatened by habitat loss.
