= Mertensophryne taitana =

Conservation status
- Least Concern (IUCN 3.1)

Scientific classification
- Kingdom: Animalia
- Phylum: Chordata
- Class: Amphibia
- Order: Anura
- Family: Bufonidae
- Genus: Mertensophryne
- Species: M. taitana

Binomial name
- Mertensophryne taitana (Peters, 1878)

Synonyms
- Bufo taitanus Peters, 1878; Bufo katanganus Loveridge, 1932; Bufo ushoranus Loveridge, 1932

Species of amphibian

Mertensophryne taitana (common names: Taita toad, Black-chested dwarf toad, Taita dwarf toad, dwarf toad) is a species of toad in the family Bufonidae. It is found in southeastern Kenya and southward through Tanzania to southeastern Democratic Republic of the Congo, northern Zambia, Malawi, and adjacent Mozambique. Its natural habitats are sandy places in woodlands, grasslands, open savanna, and agricultural fields. It is an opportunistic breeder utilizing small, temporary pools, and apparently, streams. The tadpole develop very fast, reaching metamorphosis in only 13 days. This adaptable species is not believed to face any significant threats.
