= Arthroleptis schubotzi =

Burundi screeching frog

Conservation status
- Least Concern (IUCN 3.1)

Scientific classification
- Kingdom: Animalia
- Phylum: Chordata
- Class: Amphibia
- Order: Anura
- Family: Arthroleptidae
- Genus: Arthroleptis
- Species: A. schubotzi

Binomial name
- Arthroleptis schubotzi Nieden, 1911

Synonyms
- Schoutedenella discodactyla Laurent, 1954; Schoutedenella kivuensis de Witte, 1941; Arthroleptis discodactyla – Laurent, 1957; Schoutedenella schubotzi – Laurent, 1985; Arthroleptis kivuensis – Gorham, 1974

Species of frog

Arthroleptis schubotzi, also known as the Burundi screeching frog, Schubotz's squeaker, and Kivu dwarf litter frog, is a species of frog in the family Arthroleptidae. It is found in the African Rift Valley in eastern Democratic Republic of the Congo (Kivu), southwestern Tanzania, Burundi, Rwanda, and western Uganda. There are taxonomic problems in delimiting this species.

== Etymology ==
The specific name honours the German zoologist Johann G. Hermann Schubotz (1881–1955).

== Description ==
A. schubotzi is a very small Arthroleptis species: adult males measure 19–21 mm (0.7–0.8 in) and adult females 17–23 mm (0.7–0.9 in) in snout–vent length. The tympanum is distinct and half the size of the eye. The legs are short. The belly is pigmented. Colouration is cryptic and commonly involves a dark spot on the head. Males have a black throat.

The male advertisement call is a harsh series of double chirps.

== Habitat and conservation ==
Arthroleptis schubotzi occurs in closed tropical forest, forest edges, savanna, and agricultural areas outside forest at elevations of approximately 1,460–2,800 m (4,790–9,190 ft) above sea level, perhaps wider. It is an adaptable leaf-litter species. It breeds by direct development, (i.e., there is no free-living larval stage) thereby not depending on water.

Specific threats to this species are unknown, but it probably will not tolerate complete opening of its habitat. It is occurs in the Virunga National Park in the Democratic Republic of Congo and in the Kibale and Bwindi National Parks in Uganda.
