= Amnirana lemairei =

Conservation status
- Least Concern (IUCN 3.1)

Scientific classification
- Domain: Eukaryota
- Kingdom: Animalia
- Phylum: Chordata
- Class: Amphibia
- Order: Anura
- Family: Ranidae
- Genus: Amnirana
- Species: A. lemairei

Binomial name
- Amnirana lemairei (De Witte, 1921)

Synonyms
- Hylarana lemairei (De Witte, 1921)

Species of frog

Amnirana lemairei is a species of frog in the family Ranidae. It is found in Angola, Democratic Republic of the Congo, and Zambia. Its natural habitats are dry savanna and moist savanna.
