= Sclerophrys gracilipes =

Conservation status
- Least Concern (IUCN 3.1)

Scientific classification
- Kingdom: Animalia
- Phylum: Chordata
- Class: Amphibia
- Order: Anura
- Family: Bufonidae
- Genus: Sclerophrys
- Species: S. gracilipes

Binomial name
- Sclerophrys gracilipes (Boulenger, 1899)

Synonyms
- Bufo gracilipes Boulenger, 1899; Amietophrynus gracilipes (Boulenger, 1899); Bufo petiti Knoepffler, 1967

Species of amphibian

Sclerophrys gracilipes is a species of toad in the family Bufonidae. It is found in southeastern Nigeria and east- and southward to southern Cameroon, Equatorial Guinea (including the island of Bioko), Gabon, northern Republic of the Congo, and northern and northeastern Democratic Republic of the Congo. It is also likely to occur in southwestern Central African Republic and in the Cabinda Enclave of Angola. The holotype was collected from the Benito River in what was then French Congo. Common name French Congo toad has been coined for it.

Sclerophrys gracilipes is a very common species that is found in lowland forest at elevations below 200 m (660 ft). It can also survive in degraded secondary habitats. Breeding takes place in flowing water, such as creeks in marshes and slow-flowing streams. It can be affected by habitat loss. It occurs in the Monte Alén National Park in Equatorial Guinea and in the Garamba National Park in the Democratic Republic of the Congo, and presumably in other protected areas too.
