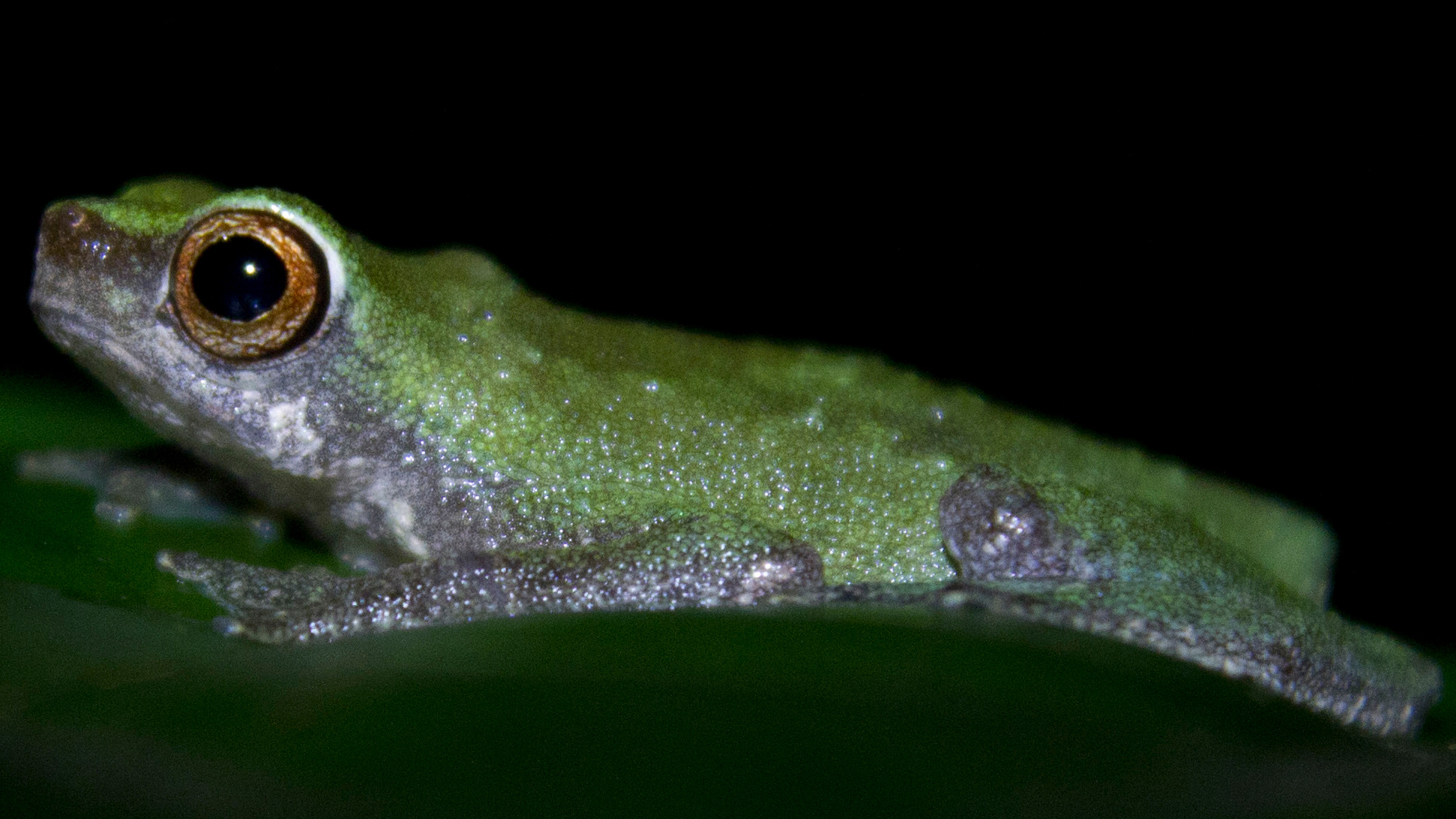

Conservation status
- Least Concern (IUCN 3.1)

Scientific classification
- Kingdom: Animalia
- Phylum: Chordata
- Class: Amphibia
- Order: Anura
- Family: Bufonidae
- Genus: Nectophryne
- Species: N. batesii

Binomial name
- Nectophryne batesii Boulenger, 1913

= Bates's tree toad =

Species of amphibian

Bates's tree toad (Nectophryne batesii) is a species of toad in the family Bufonidae. It is recorded in an area running from southern Cameroon to south-western Gabon through south-western Central African Republic to north-eastern Democratic Republic of the Congo; it presumably occurs in Equatorial Guinea and Congo, and perhaps in Nigeria, but has not yet been recorded there. Its common and specific names commemorate George Latimer Bates (1863–1940), an American naturalist who traveled in West Africa.

Its natural habitat is tropical moist lowland forests. It requires tall forest and is not found in heavily degraded habitats. They are terrestrial during the day, but move up in the vegetation at night. They breed in tree cavities containing water. It can be locally threatened by habitat loss.
