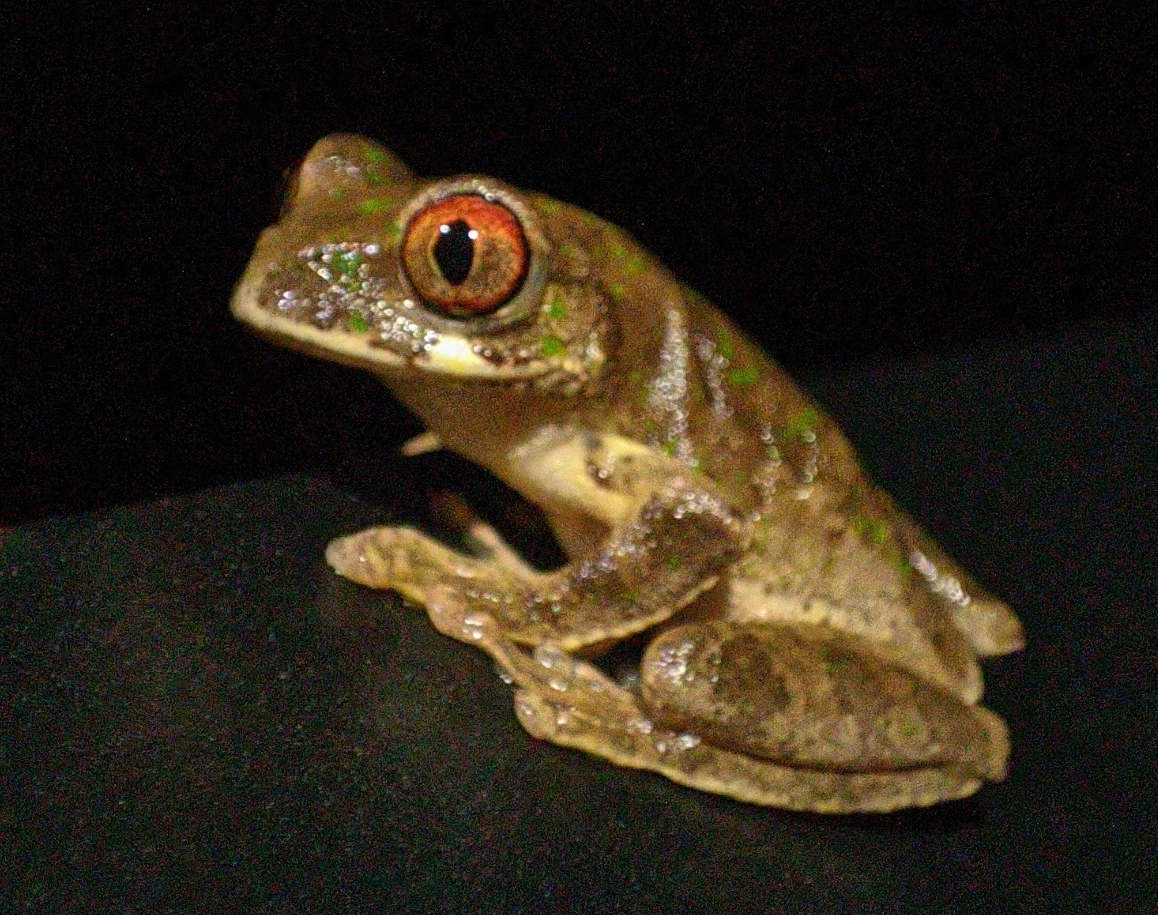

Conservation status
- Vulnerable (IUCN 3.1)

Scientific classification
- Kingdom: Animalia
- Phylum: Chordata
- Class: Amphibia
- Order: Anura
- Family: Arthroleptidae
- Genus: Leptopelis
- Species: L. karissimbensis

Binomial name
- Leptopelis karissimbensis Ahl, 1929

= Leptopelis karissimbensis =

Species of amphibian

Leptopelis karissimbensis is a species of frog in the family Arthroleptidae. It is found in the highlands of western Rwanda and southwestern Uganda and in the adjacent eastern Democratic Republic of the Congo. It is very similar to Leptopelis kivuensis and has been confused with that species. Common names Karissimbi forest treefrog and Karissimbi tree frog have been coined for it.

== Description ==
Adult males measure 27–47 mm (1.1–1.9 in) and adult females, based on two specimens only, 43–47 mm (1.7–1.9 in) in snout–vent length. The tympanum is small. The fingers and toes have reduced webbing. Dorsal coloration varies from gray to reddish-brown. There are often dark brown triangular patterns between the eyes and sacrum, an irregular dark brown line running from the canthus rostralis through the eye and over the tympanum to the forelimb, dark brown spots or irregular lines on the flanks, and dark brown crossbars on the upper side of the limbs. Green or yellow flecks on the dorsum may also be present. All adults have a distinct white spot under the eye. The iris is red to reddish-brown. Males have a blue gular vocal sac.

The male advertisement call consists of a buzz followed by a clack, but the buzz is often left out.

== Habitat and conservation ==
Leptopelis karissimbensis occurs at elevations of 1,800–3,200 m (5,900–10,500 ft) above sea level. It is associated with forests and wetlands within forests, and towards the high end of its elevational range, seasonally flooded marshes. Reproduction is unknown but presumably involves free-living larvae.

Leptopelis karissimbensis is locally abundant. It is threatened by deforestation caused by agriculture, cattle ranching, and gold mining. It occurs in the Kahuzi-Biega and Virunga National Parks in the Democratic Republic of Congo and in the Volcanoes and Nyungwe National Parks in Rwanda.
