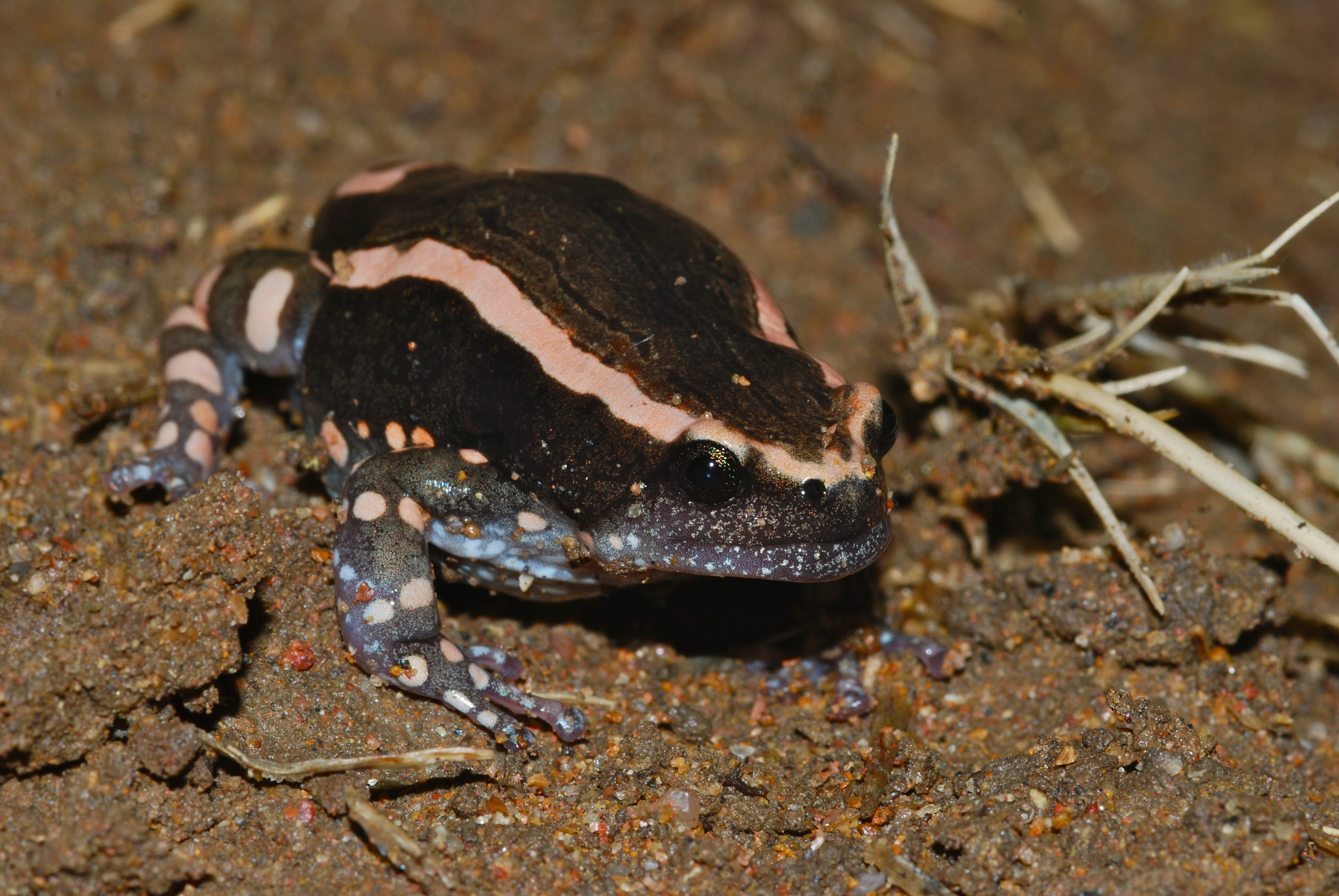
- Phrynomantis bifasciatus in Manyane Resort Walking Trail, Pilanesberg, South Africa

Conservation status
- Least Concern (IUCN 3.1)

Scientific classification
- Kingdom: Animalia
- Phylum: Chordata
- Class: Amphibia
- Order: Anura
- Family: Microhylidae
- Genus: Phrynomantis
- Species: P. bifasciatus

Binomial name
- Phrynomantis bifasciatus (Smith, 1847)

= Banded rubber frog =

Species of amphibian

The banded rubber frog (Phrynomantis bifasciatus) is a species of frog in the family Microhylidae. It is found in central and southern Africa. Its natural habitats are dry savanna, moist savanna, subtropical or tropical dry shrubland, subtropical or tropical moist shrubland, subtropical or tropical dry lowland grassland, subtropical or tropical seasonally wet or flooded lowland grassland, subtropical or tropical high-altitude grassland, intermittent freshwater lakes, intermittent freshwater marshes, arable land, pastureland, water storage areas, ponds, and canals and ditches.

== Description ==
The Banded rubber frog is primarily black, with two stripes on the back and spots on the legs, which can range from pink to orange in color. Its length is 4 to 6 cm (1.6 to 2.4 in).

== Toxicity ==
These frogs release a milky toxic substance through their skin. This substance can be lethal both to other frog species and humans.

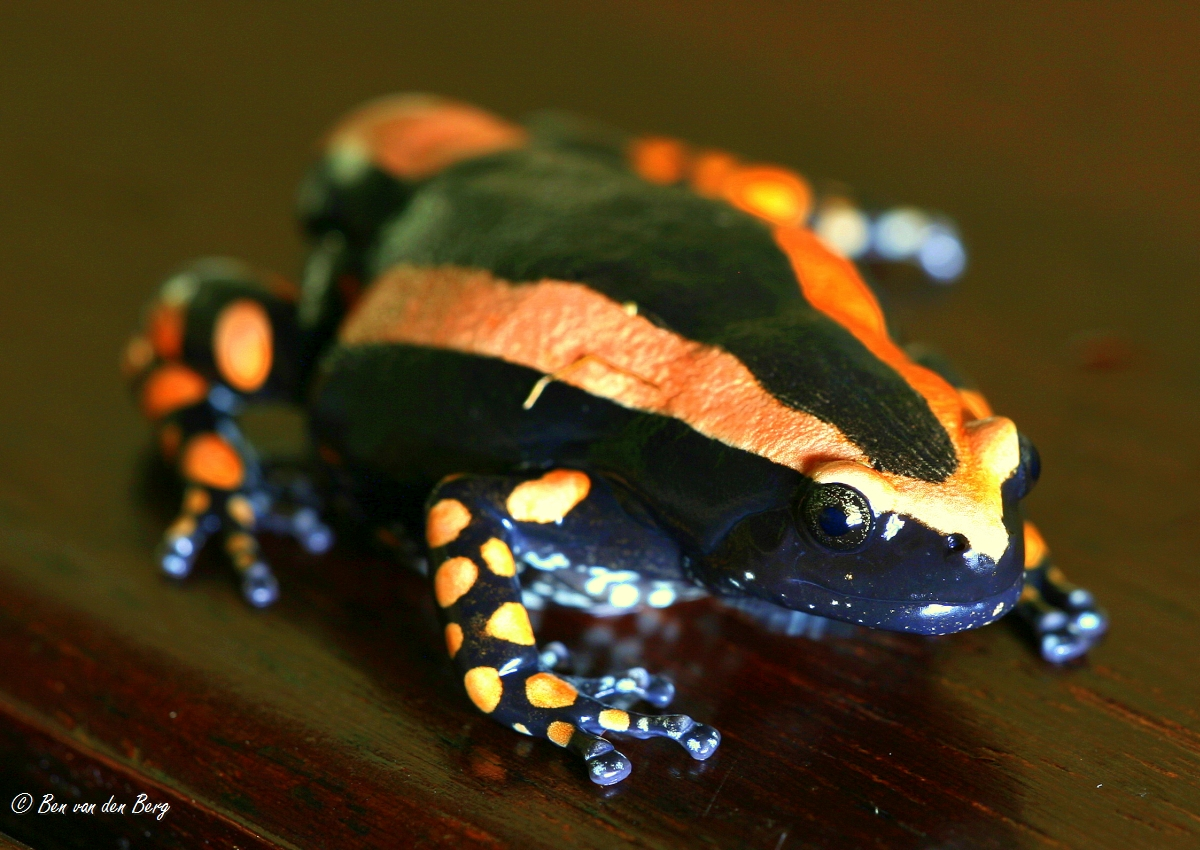
Photo of a Red Banded Rubber Frog

== Captivity ==
This species of Microhylid is kept in captivity because they produce copious skin secretions with an unpleasant odor that are toxic irritants and are lethal to other frogs.
