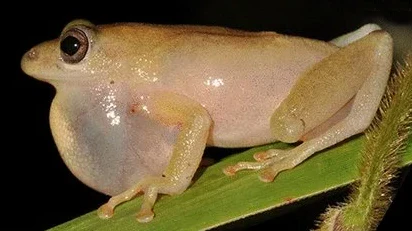

Conservation status
- Least Concern (IUCN 3.1)

Scientific classification
- Kingdom: Animalia
- Phylum: Chordata
- Class: Amphibia
- Order: Anura
- Family: Hyperoliidae
- Genus: Hyperolius
- Species: H. balfouri

Binomial name
- Hyperolius balfouri (Werner, 1908)

Synonyms
- Rappia balfouri Werner, 1908 "1907"; Hyperolius zavattarii Scortecci, 1943; Hyperolius concolor viridistriatus Monard, 1951

= Hyperolius balfouri =

Species of frog

Hyperolius balfouri is a species of frog in the family Hyperoliidae. It is found in Cameroon, Central African Republic, northeastern Democratic Republic of the Congo, South Sudan, southwestern Ethiopia, Uganda, and western Kenya. The specific name balfouri honours J.W. Balfour, a missionary in Uganda. Common names Balfour's reed frog and Ethiopia reed frog have been coined for this species, with the latter name referring to the now-synonymized Hyperolius zavattarii. Populations from the western part of the range may be referred to the subspecies Hyperolius balfouri viridistriatus.

== Description ==
Adult males measure 28–34 mm (1.1–1.3 in) and adult females 36–42 mm (1.4–1.7 in) in snout–vent length. The dorsum is yellow to brown with thin, dark dorsolateral stripes. In the eastern populations these are shorter, extending 2/3 down the body, whereas in the western populations the lines are green and better developed; often a dark middorsal line, sometimes split into spots, is present. The venter and throat are white to orange. Males possess a large, flat, somewhat shagreened gular flap and small asperities on the dorsum. Females have smooth skin.

== Habitat and conservation ==
Hyperolius balfouri occurs in savannas at elevations below 820 m (2,690 ft). In southwestern Ethiopia it can occur in tropical deciduous forests, and it can also occur formerly forested areas in Cameroon. Breeding takes place in small pools. It is an abundant species that is unlikely to face significant threats, except perhaps in the Ethiopian part of its range where deforestation could be a threat. It occurs in some protected areas.
