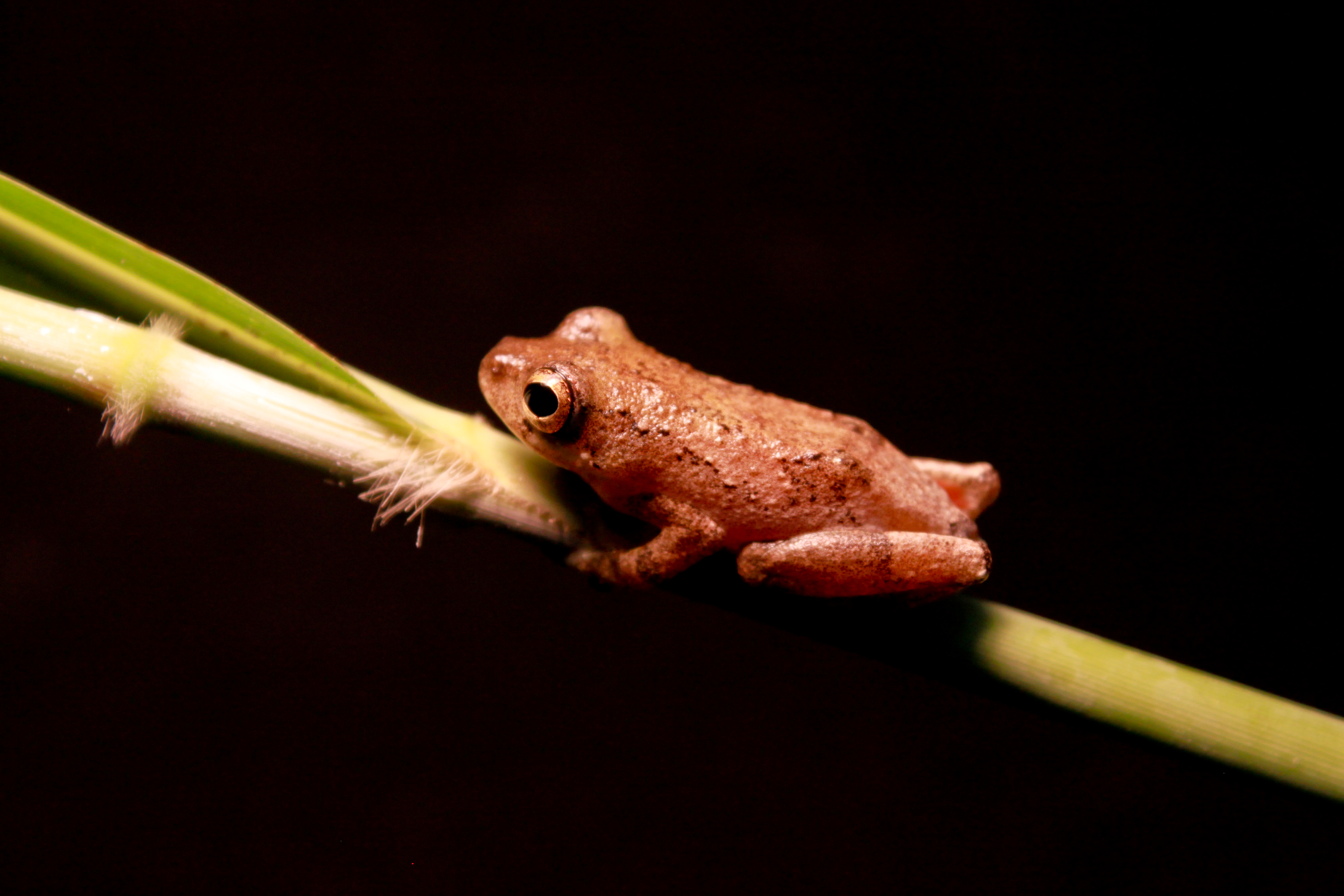

Conservation status
- Least Concern (IUCN 3.1)

Scientific classification
- Kingdom: Animalia
- Phylum: Chordata
- Class: Amphibia
- Order: Anura
- Family: Hyperoliidae
- Genus: Hyperolius
- Species: H. tuberculatus

Binomial name
- Hyperolius tuberculatus (Mocquard, 1897)

Synonyms
- Rappia tuberculata Mocquard, 1897

= Hyperolius tuberculatus =

Species of amphibian

Hyperolius tuberculatus is a species of frog in the family Hyperoliidae. Its common name is rainforest reed frog. It ranges from the southeastern Nigeria to the Central Africa in Cameroon, western Central African Republic, Equatorial Guinea, Gabon, Republic of the Congo, and Democratic Republic of the Congo. It is also likely to occur in the Cabinda enclave of Angola.

== Taxonomy and systematics ==
Hyperolius tuberculatus is part of the so-called H. tuberculatus complex, which also includes Hyperolius dintelmanni and Hyperolius hutsebauti. Molecular data suggest that specimens from the eastern part of the range of H. tuberculatus in the Democratic Republic of the Congo are actually H. hutsebauti, but the actual limits of these species are not known because of the lack of samples.

== Description ==
Adult males measure 28–32 mm (1.1–1.3 in) and adult females 30–36 mm (1.2–1.4 in) in snout–vent length. The dorsum is warty and shows an hour-glass pattern. The pupil is horizontal. There is no distinct phase F ("female phase") colouring, but females are often uniformly coloured.

== Habitat and conservation ==
Hyperolius tuberculatus is found in forest clearings and heavily degraded former forest as well as in secondary forest in the central African rainforest belt; it does not occur in closed, undisturbed forest. Its breeding habitat is flexible: breeding can take place in both still and flowing water, and in both temporary and permanent waterbodies. This common and adaptable species is not facing any significant threats.

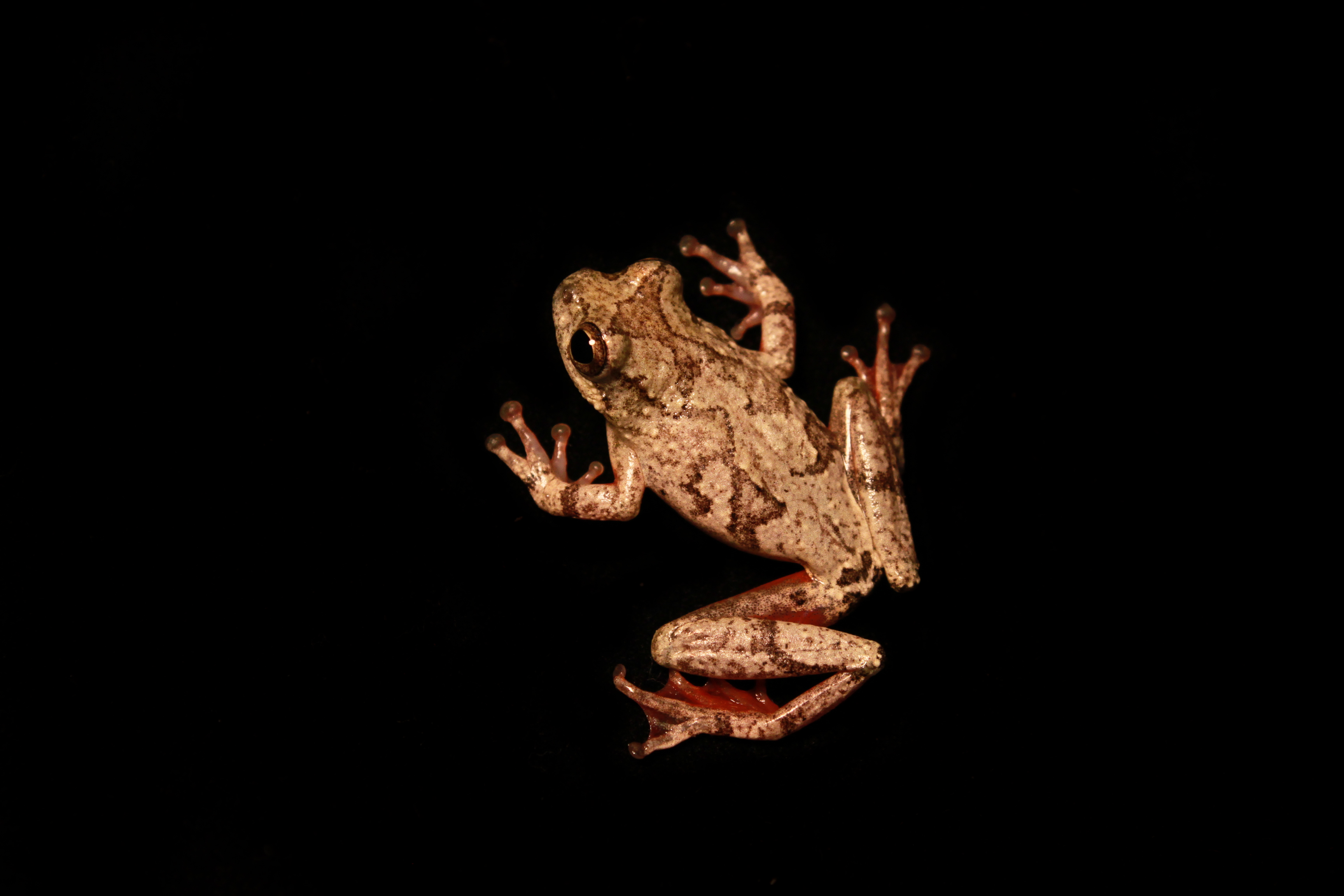
Dorsal view
