= Hyperolius quinquevittatus =

Conservation status
- Least Concern (IUCN 3.1)

Scientific classification
- Kingdom: Animalia
- Phylum: Chordata
- Class: Amphibia
- Order: Anura
- Family: Hyperoliidae
- Genus: Hyperolius
- Species: H. quinquevittatus

Binomial name
- Hyperolius quinquevittatus Bocage, 1866

Species of frog

Hyperolius quinquevittatus is a species of frog in the family Hyperoliidae. It is found in Angola, Democratic Republic of the Congo, Malawi, Tanzania, Zambia, and possibly Mozambique. Its natural habitats are moist savanna, subtropical or tropical high-altitude grassland, swamps, freshwater marshes, and intermittent freshwater marshes.
