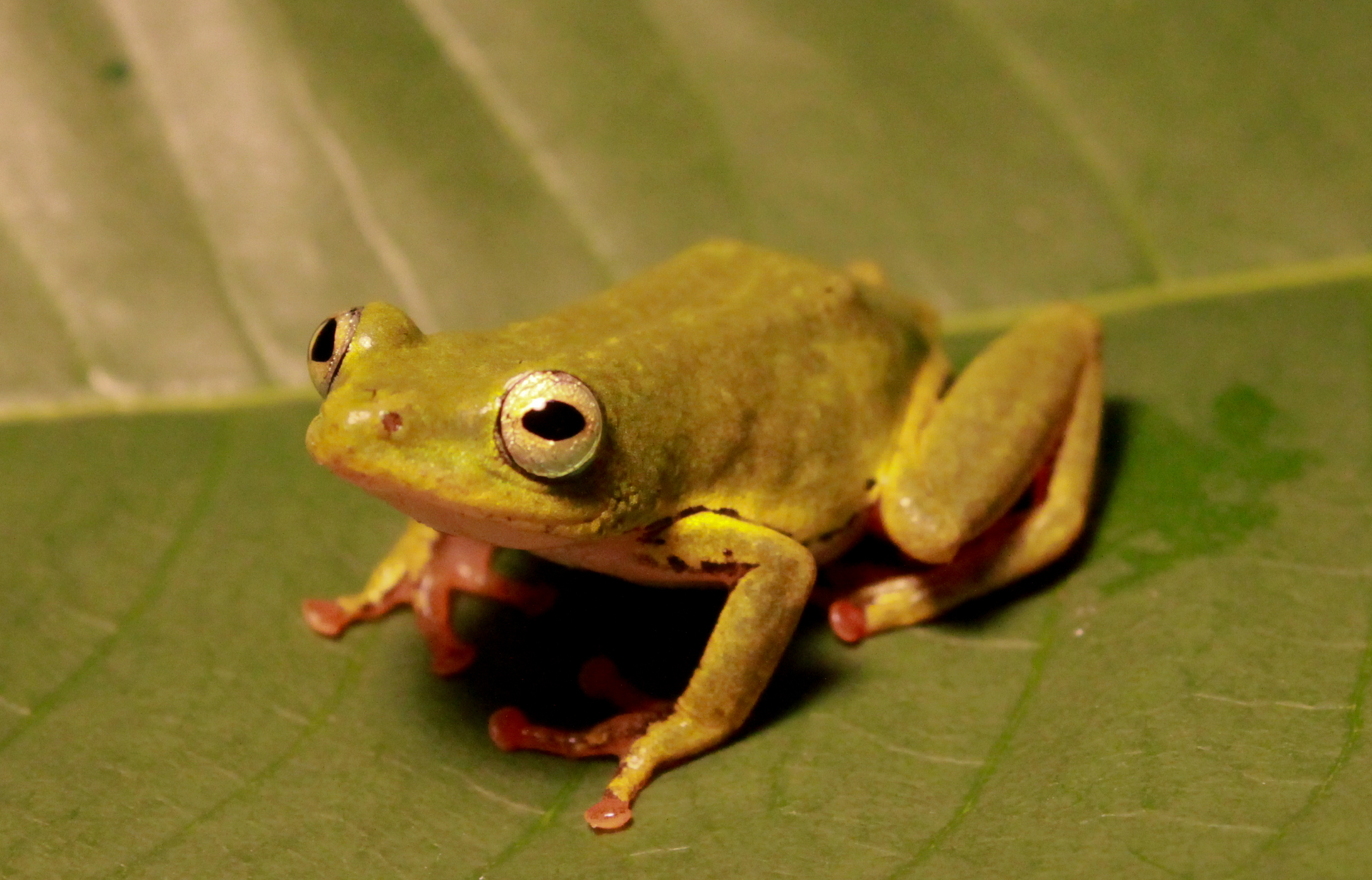

Conservation status
- Least Concern (IUCN 3.1)

Scientific classification
- Kingdom: Animalia
- Phylum: Chordata
- Class: Amphibia
- Order: Anura
- Family: Hyperoliidae
- Genus: Hyperolius
- Species: H. cinnamomeoventris

Binomial name
- Hyperolius cinnamomeoventris Bocage, 1866

= Hyperolius cinnamomeoventris =

Species of frog

Hyperolius cinnamomeoventris is a species of frog in the family Hyperoliidae. It is found in Angola, Cameroon, Republic of the Congo, Democratic Republic of the Congo, Equatorial Guinea, Gabon, Ghana, Kenya, Uganda, Zambia, and possibly in Central African Republic, Rwanda, Sudan, and Tanzania. Its natural habitats are subtropical or tropical moist lowland forests, subtropical or tropical swamps, subtropical or tropical moist montane forests, dry savanna, moist savanna, subtropical or tropical seasonally wet or flooded lowland grassland, swamps, freshwater lakes, intermittent freshwater lakes, freshwater marshes, intermittent freshwater marshes, rural gardens, heavily degraded former forest, and ponds.

== Sources ==
- Schiøtz, A., Amiet, J.-L., Howell, K. & Burger, M. 2004. Hyperolius cinnamomeoventris. 2006 IUCN Red List of Threatened Species. Downloaded on 22 July 2007.
