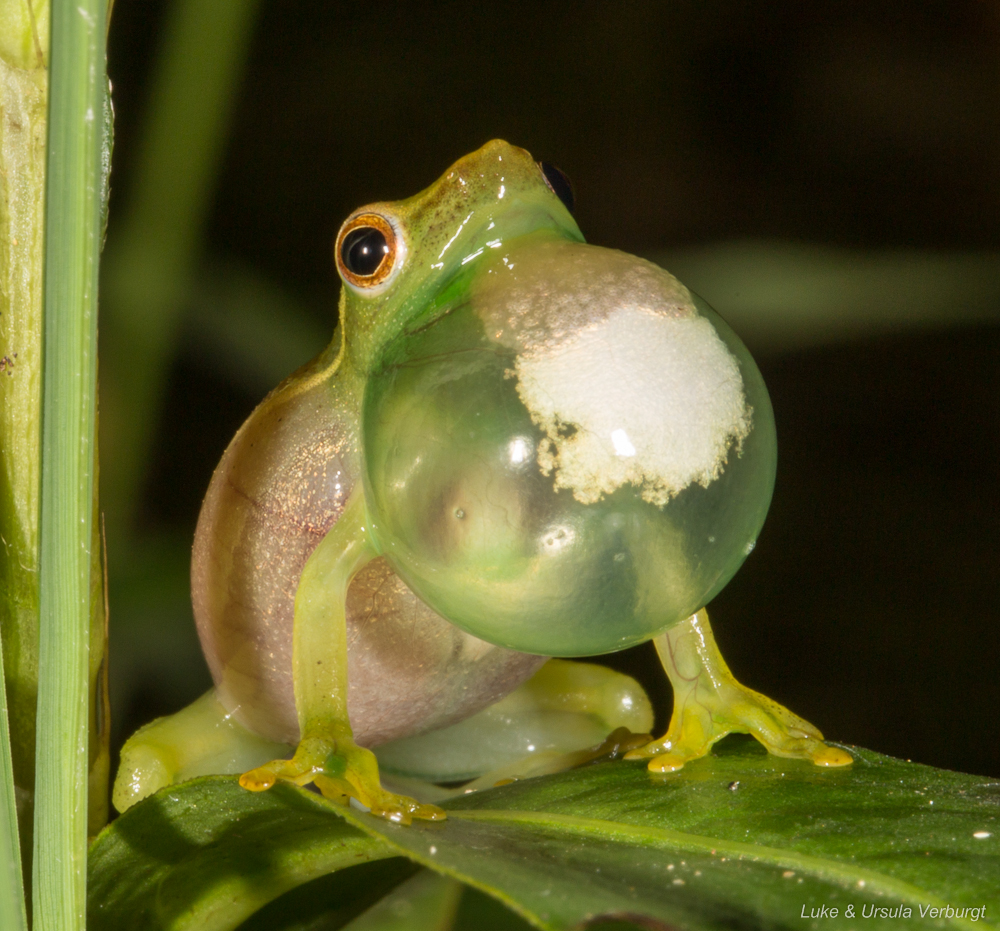
- Hyperolius acuticeps Seldomseen

Conservation status
- Least Concern (IUCN 3.1)

Scientific classification
- Kingdom: Animalia
- Phylum: Chordata
- Class: Amphibia
- Order: Anura
- Family: Hyperoliidae
- Genus: Hyperolius
- Species: H. microps

Binomial name
- Hyperolius microps Günther, 1864

Synonyms
- Rappia microps (Günther, 1864); Hyperolius acuticeps Ahl, 1931; Hyperolius usaramoae Loveridge, 1932

= Hyperolius microps =

Species of amphibian

Hyperolius microps is a species of frogs in the family Hyperoliidae. It is known with some certainty from northern Malawi, extreme northern Mozambique, Tanzania, and coastal Kenya; presumably its range extends into adjacent Zambia. However, its range and delimitation differs widely between sources (see below).

== Range and taxonomy ==
Hyperolius microps was described in 1864 by Albert Günther based on material collected from extreme northern Mozambique. The understanding of this taxon and its relationships to other taxa described later has changed greatly over time, and differences persist between sources. While the Amphibian Species of the World considers Hyperolius acuticeps as a synonym of Hyperolius microps, the AmphibiaWeb recognizes both species as distinct and gives a broad distribution extending into West and South Africa for Hyperolius acuticeps. The IUCN SSC Amphibian Specialist Group only recognizes Hyperolius acuticeps but limits it to Malawi and Tanzania. Channing and Rödel (2019) only recognize Hyperolius microps but gives a slightly more restricted distribution than the Amphibian Species of the World.

== Description ==
Males grow to 21 mm (0.8 in) and females to 22 mm (0.9 in) in snout–vent length. The snout is sharply rounded. The toes are almost completely webbed. The fingers and toes bear discs that are larger in the former. The dorsum is green with a darker vertebral band composed of dense pigmented cells. There are pale lateral bands bordered by darker spots and a darker dorsolateral stripe. Males have yellow throat and the upper surfaces of digital discs.

The male advertisement call is a brief, high-pitched "buzz" consisting of 25 pulses and lasting about a quarter of a second.

== Habitat and conservation ==
Hyperolius microps occurs in savanna and grassland in association with emergent vegetation at the margins of swamps, rivers, vleis, lakes, and pools. Males call from flooded grass.

A general threat to the habitat of this species is conversion of grassland into agricultural land and diversion of water for agricultural purposes. It is present in a number of protected areas in Malawi (Nyika National Park and Kaningina and Chongoni Forest Reserves).
