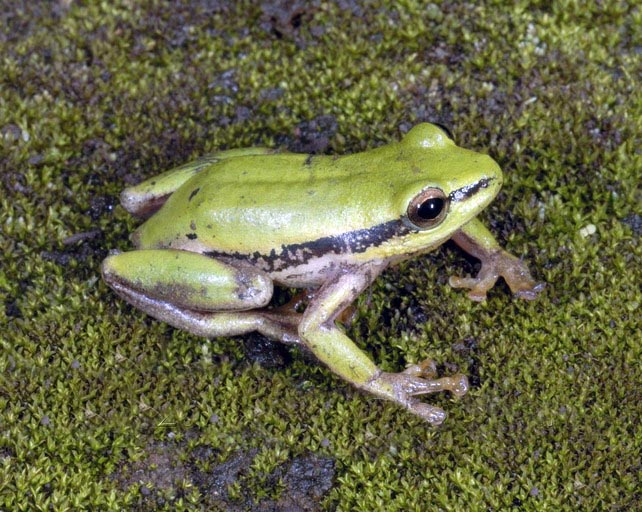

Conservation status
- Least Concern (IUCN 3.1)

Scientific classification
- Kingdom: Animalia
- Phylum: Chordata
- Class: Amphibia
- Order: Anura
- Family: Hyperoliidae
- Genus: Hyperolius
- Species: H. kivuensis

Binomial name
- Hyperolius kivuensis Ahl, 1931

Synonyms
- Hyperolius multifasciatus Ahl, 1931

= Hyperolius kivuensis =

Species of amphibian

Hyperolius kivuensis is a species of frog in the family Hyperoliidae. It is found in Angola, Burundi, Democratic Republic of the Congo, Ethiopia, Kenya, Rwanda, Tanzania, Uganda, Zambia, possibly Mozambique, and possibly Sudan.

Its natural habitats are subtropical or tropical dry forests, moist savanna, subtropical or tropical seasonally wet or flooded lowland grassland, freshwater marshes, intermittent freshwater marshes, and plantations. It is not considered threatened by the IUCN.

It was recently determined that H. kivuensis and H. multifasciatus are only subspecifically distinct from each other, and the latter was synonymized with the former. Both were described in the same work by Ernst Ahl in 1931, H. multifasciatus on page 278 and H. kivuensis on page 280. Thus, it was argued that the synonymy should be the other way around.

However, if several first established in the same work are found to refer to the same species, the ICZN Code leaves the choice which name to choose to the first scientist to revise them accordingly. Furthermore, it makes the outcome of such a first revision binding. Hence, the initial synonymy cannot be repealed, and the correct scientific names of these frogs are H. kivuensis kivuensis and H. kivuensis multifasciatus.
