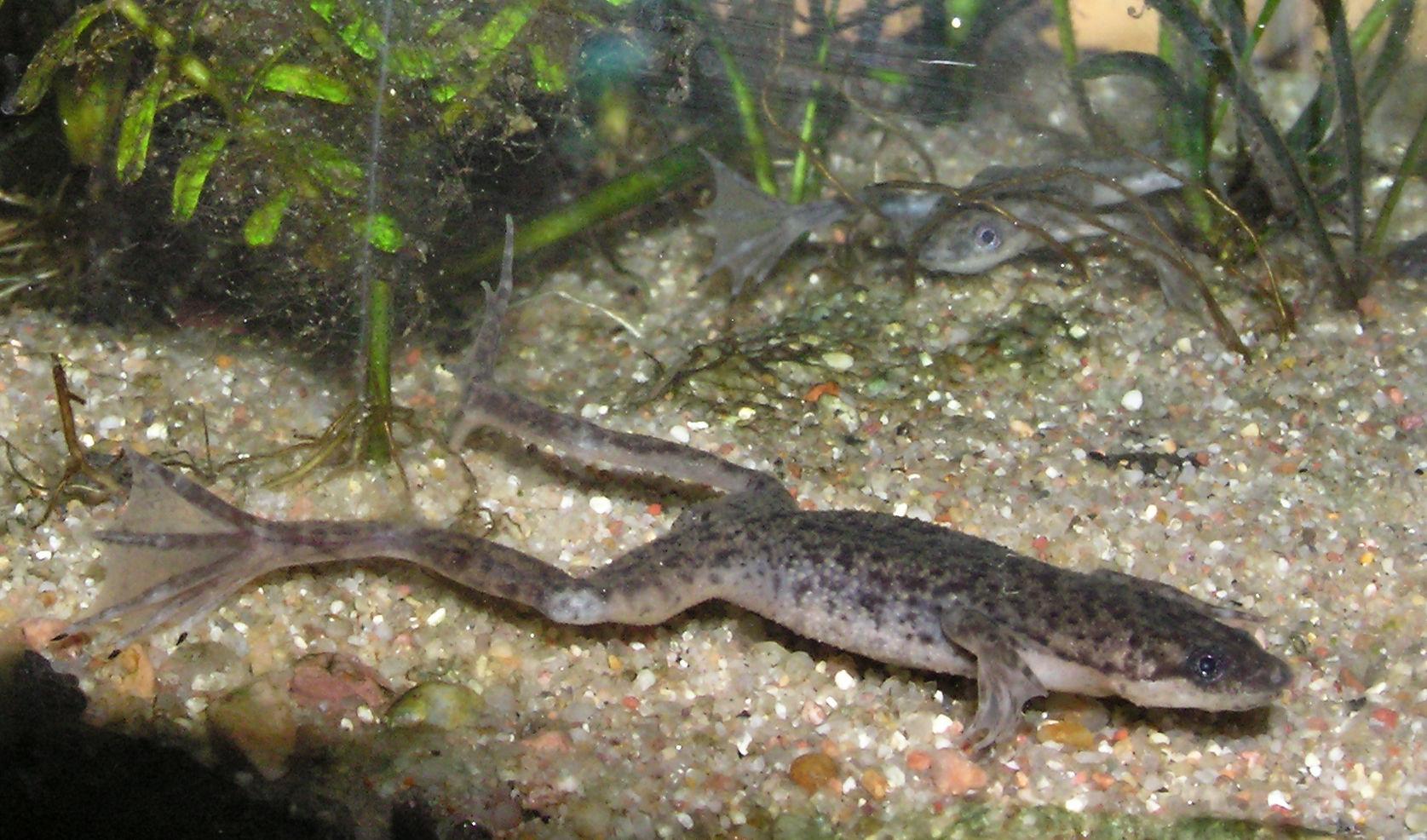
- Hymenochirus boettgeri

Conservation status
- Least Concern (IUCN 3.1)

Scientific classification
- Kingdom: Animalia
- Phylum: Chordata
- Class: Amphibia
- Order: Anura
- Family: Pipidae
- Genus: Hymenochirus
- Species: H. boettgeri

Binomial name
- Hymenochirus boettgeri (Tornier, 1896)

Synonyms
- Xenopus boettgeri Tornier, 1896

= Hymenochirus boettgeri =

Species of frog

Hymenochirus boettgeri, also known as the Zaire dwarf clawed frog or the Congo dwarf clawed frog, is a species of frog in the family Pipidae. It is found in Nigeria, Cameroon, Equatorial Guinea, Gabon, and east to the Central African Republic and to eastern Democratic Republic of the Congo. It presumably occurs in the Republic of the Congo but has not been recorded there. It is a common species over most of its wide range and the International Union for Conservation of Nature has assessed its conservation status as being of least concern.

== Online Model Organism Database ==
Xenbase provides partial support (BLAST, JBrowse tracks, genome download) for H. boettgeri.

== Etymology ==
The specific name boettgeri honours Oskar Boettger, a German zoologist.

== Description ==
This aquatic frog is generally some shade of brown or grey, speckled with darker spots. The head is narrow and tapering, it lacks a tongue and eyelids. The legs are long and there are claws on the hind feet. Females, at up to 35 mm (1.4 in) are larger than males. The tympanum is twice as large in males as it is in females, giving males the appearance of having a swollen head. Males also have a large subdermal gland on the hind part of their forearm which appears as a white spot near the armpit. This gland enlarges during the breeding season.

== Habitat ==
Hymenochirus boettgeri is an aquatic frog that generally occurs in still, shaded water in lowland rainforest and in pools by slow-flowing rivers.

== In captivity ==
This species is also bred and sold as aquatic pets, often under name African dwarf frog that also includes other Hymenochirus species. As pets, African dwarf frogs can live peacefully among other fish in an aquarium. Their tank mates should be neither large enough to pose a predatory threat to the frogs, nor small enough to become food for the frogs themselves. They are not an especially demanding species, and can be kept in most standard aquarium setups. Seeing as how they must breathe air to survive and can escape from the tank, aquariums that are not too tall and are well-covered are a must. They can be fed a diet of suitably-sized food items designed for use with aquarium fish, including live, frozen and freeze-dried bloodworms, tubifex worms, and brine shrimp. These frogs are not picky but overfeeding will quickly lead to obesity. They will also eat any form of prepared food that sinks to the bottom.
