= Afrixalus vibekensis =

Conservation status
- Least Concern (IUCN 3.1)

Scientific classification
- Kingdom: Animalia
- Phylum: Chordata
- Class: Amphibia
- Order: Anura
- Family: Hyperoliidae
- Genus: Afrixalus
- Species: A. vibekensis

Binomial name
- Afrixalus vibekensis Schiøtz, 1967

Synonyms
- Afrixalus laevis vibekensis Schiøtz, 1967

Species of amphibian

Afrixalus vibekensis, sometimes known as the Nimba banana frog, is a species of frogs in the family Hyperoliidae. It is confirmed to exist in two locations in Côte d'Ivoire and one in Ghana, and it possibly occurs in Guinea and Liberia. It was originally described as subspecies of Afrixalus laevis and the type locality is in Côte d'Ivoire near Mount Nimba.

== Description ==
Adult males measure 19–23 mm (0.7–0.9 in) and adult females 23–27 mm (0.9–1.1 in) in snout–vent length. The dorsum is yellowish white with a darker or lighter brown pattern; the pattern does not vary between individuals (as in Afrixalus laevis). Males lack asperities.

The male advertisement call consists of an inconspicuous buzzing with low intensity, which is then followed by a creaking sound.

== Habitat and conservation ==
Afrixalus vibekensis occurs in forest edge habitats such as forest road margins and tree-fall gaps. Breeding takes place in small temporary ponds and puddles. The eggs are laid either on leaves above water or directly in the water.

This species is difficult to find and might be under-recorded. It is threatened by habitat loss caused by agricultural encroachment, expanding human settlements, and logging. It occurs in the Taï National Park and Haute Dodo Classified Forest in Côte d'Ivoire and in the Bobiri Forest Reserve and Butterfly Sanctuary in Ghana.
