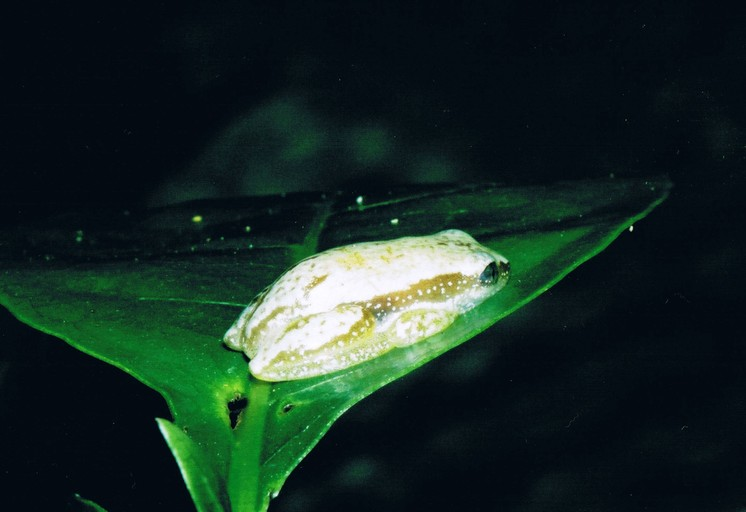

Conservation status
- Least Concern (IUCN 3.1)

Scientific classification
- Kingdom: Animalia
- Phylum: Chordata
- Class: Amphibia
- Order: Anura
- Family: Hyperoliidae
- Genus: Afrixalus
- Species: A. delicatus

Binomial name
- Afrixalus delicatus Pickersgill, 1984

= Afrixalus delicatus =

Species of amphibian

Afrixalus delicatus, the delicate leaf-folding frog, delicate spiny reed frog or Pickersgill's banana frog, is a species of frogs in the family Hyperoliidae. It is found in Southern and Eastern Africa, from eastern South Africa and Eswatini (not confirmed) northward through Mozambique, the low altitude parts of Malawi and Tanzania, southeastern Kenya to southern Somalia.

== Taxonomy ==
Afrixalus delicatus was described in 1984 by Martin Pickersgill. The account of Afrixalus delicatus in the AmphibiaWeb combines this species with Afrixalus brachycnemis, although it also recognizes the latter species as a subspecies of Afrixalus stuhlmanni. The Amphibian Species of the World treats A. brachycnemis as a valid species. Application of these names is discussed in Poynton (2007).

== Description ==
Adult males measure 15–20 mm (0.59–0.79 in) and females 17–22 mm (0.67–0.87 in) in snout–vent length. The dorsum is light brown to gold with a brassy sheen. There are vague brown speckles over the mid-dorsum and a lateral line that is well-defined in its anterior part; these vary in colouration from reddish brown to nearly black, depending probably on temperature, light and humidity. The tibia is yellow and has an oblique transverse stripe. The venter is white. The gular disc is orange-yellow and the hidden areas of limbs are yellowish. Most parts of the body are covered by tiny asperities.

The male advertisement call is a high-pitched rattle composed of a number of distinct, separate clicks, or in the second call type, an intense, high-pitched buzz-like "zick" on a rising note; it is the latter that appears to be the mating call.

== Habitat and conservation ==
Afrixalus delicatus inhabit coastal bush land, savanna, shrubland, grassland, forest, thicket and modified habitats at elevations up to 500 m (1,600 ft) above sea level. Breeding takes place in emergent vegetation, usually at the edges of relatively permanent water bodies. They favour plants with long leaves, suitable for being folded to make leaf nests over water. During the day they may hide in leaf axils of rum lilies of the genus Zantedeschia.

Afrixalus delicatus is common in the northern part of its range, where very large breeding aggregations are found. It is uncommon in extreme south where it has declined, although it may have been overlooked. In the southern part of its range it is threatened by drying up breeding sites, caused by sugar cane farming, urbanization, and the spread of eucalyptus. Chemical mosquito control may threaten some populations. It is present in many protected areas.
