= Afrixalus upembae =

Conservation status
- Data Deficient (IUCN 3.1)

Scientific classification
- Kingdom: Animalia
- Phylum: Chordata
- Class: Amphibia
- Order: Anura
- Family: Hyperoliidae
- Genus: Afrixalus
- Species: A. upembae

Binomial name
- Afrixalus upembae (Laurent, 1941)

Synonyms
- Megalixalus leptosomus upembae Laurent, 1941; Afrixalus leptosomus upembae (Laurent, 1941); Hyperolius fulvovittatus upembae (Laurent, 1941)

Species of frog

Afrixalus upembae is a species of frog in the family Hyperoliidae. It is endemic to the Democratic Republic of the Congo and is known from the lower Katanga Province (=Shaba Province), although its true distribution might be wider; possibly reaching eastern Angola. It belongs to the taxonomically unresolved "Afrixalus quadrivittatus complex", and it is not even clear that it is a valid species.

== Description ==
The body is relatively elongate. The dorsum is dark brown and has three light stripes that merge on the snout. The brown dorsal bands have diffuse borders.

== Habitat and conservation ==
Afrixalus upembae lives in moist savanna and probably breeds in small pools. The type series consists more of one thousand specimens, suggesting it is an abundant species. However, the type series does not contain any mature males, possibly because juveniles and females might use different daytime hiding places than males.

Major threats to this species are unknown, as is its recent population status. It can be found in Upemba National Park.

The eponymous Lake Upemba is the type locality of Afrixalus upembae
