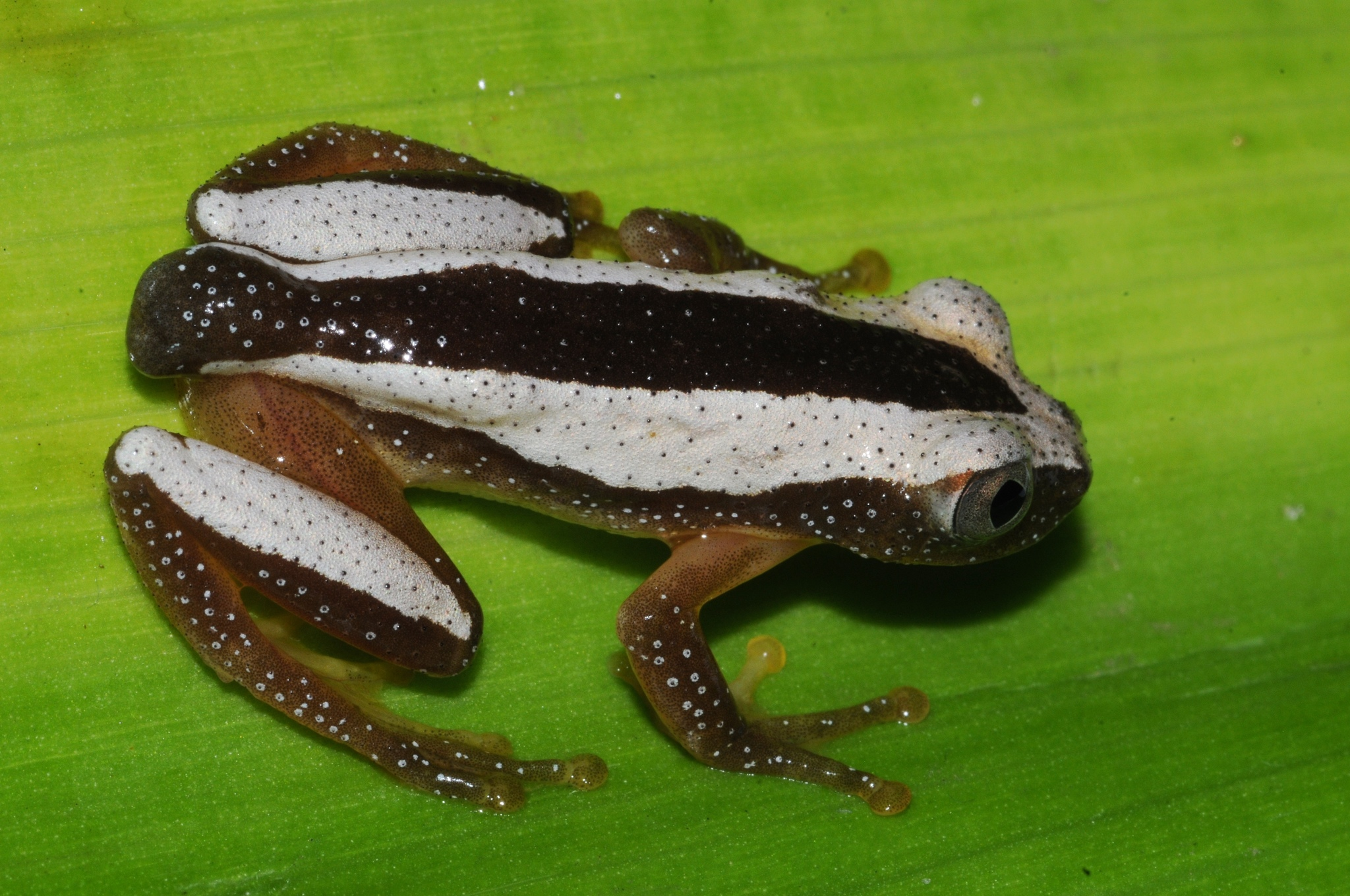

Conservation status
- Least Concern (IUCN 3.1)

Scientific classification
- Kingdom: Animalia
- Phylum: Chordata
- Class: Amphibia
- Order: Anura
- Family: Hyperoliidae
- Genus: Afrixalus
- Species: A. fornasini

Binomial name
- Afrixalus fornasini (Bianconi, 1849)

= Afrixalus fornasini =

Species of amphibian

Afrixalus fornasini is a species of frog in the family Hyperoliidae and is native to Africa. Its common name is Fornasini's spiny reed frog or the greater leaf-folding frog

The specific epithet fornasini is in honour of Italian amateur naturalist Carlo Antonio Fornasini, who collected the type specimen.

== Distribution and habitat ==
It is found in Kenya, Tanzania, Malawi, Mozambique, Zimbabwe, South Africa and possibly Eswatini. Its natural habitats are temperate forest, subtropical or tropical dry forest, dry savanna, moist savanna, temperate shrubland, subtropical or tropical moist shrubland, temperate grassland, subtropical or tropical seasonally wet or flooded lowland grassland, swamps, freshwater marshes, intermittent freshwater marshes, water storage areas, and ponds.

== Conservation status ==
The species is threatened in some parts of its range by habitat loss, but in general it is not very rare, and in some places common.

== Diet ==
Both male and female Afrixalus fornasinii adults prey on grey foam-nest tree frog eggs and tadpoles. This species is the first African anuran to demonstrate hetero-cannibalism by preying on eggs belonging to the same family.

== Evidence for natural selection ==
The camouflage mechanism used by the species provided compelling evidence for evolution by natural selection. The zoologist Hugh Cott's drawings and description of the frog's "coincident disruptive coloration" showed that its pattern, forming bold stripes on the legs and body, lined up (coincided) exactly when the legs were tightly folded into the body at rest, effectively disrupting its outline. The zoologists I. C. Cuthill and A. Székely noted that the way the configuration works indicates that it must have survival value, implying natural selection at work.

== Gallery ==
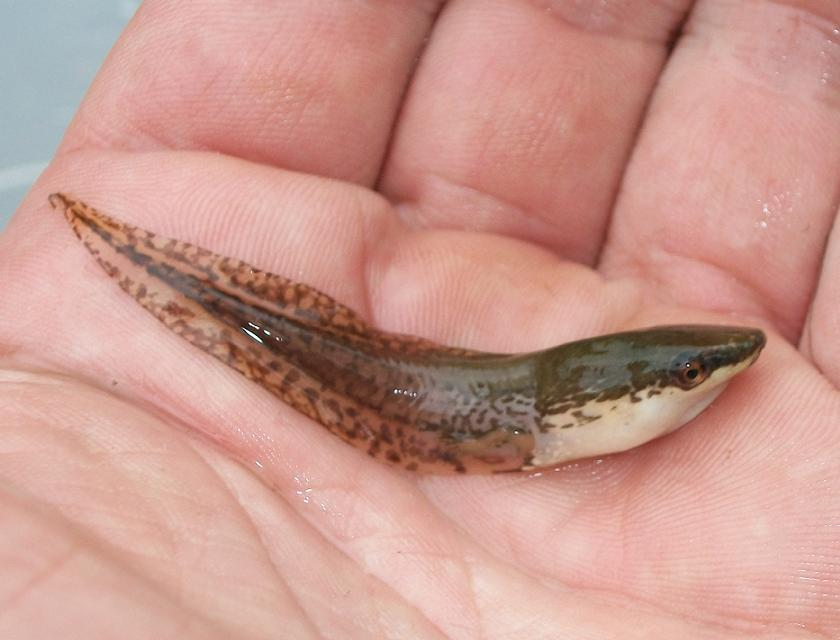
Tadpole

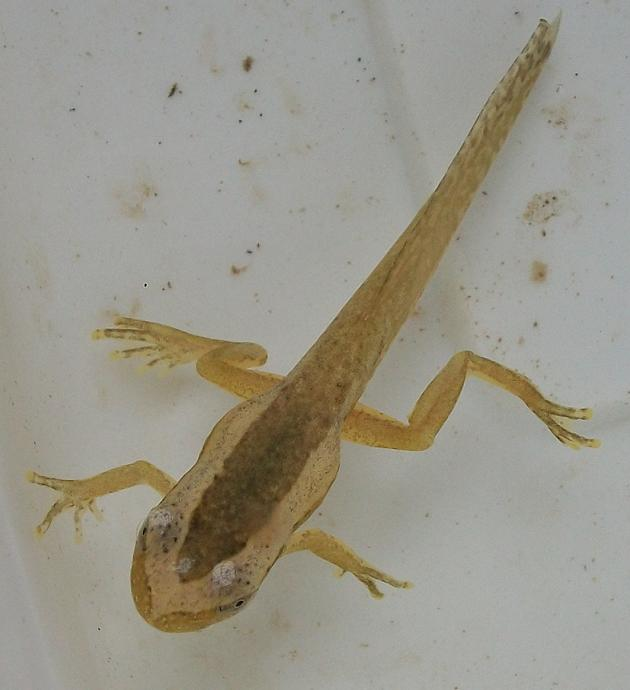
Tadpole developing into a froglet

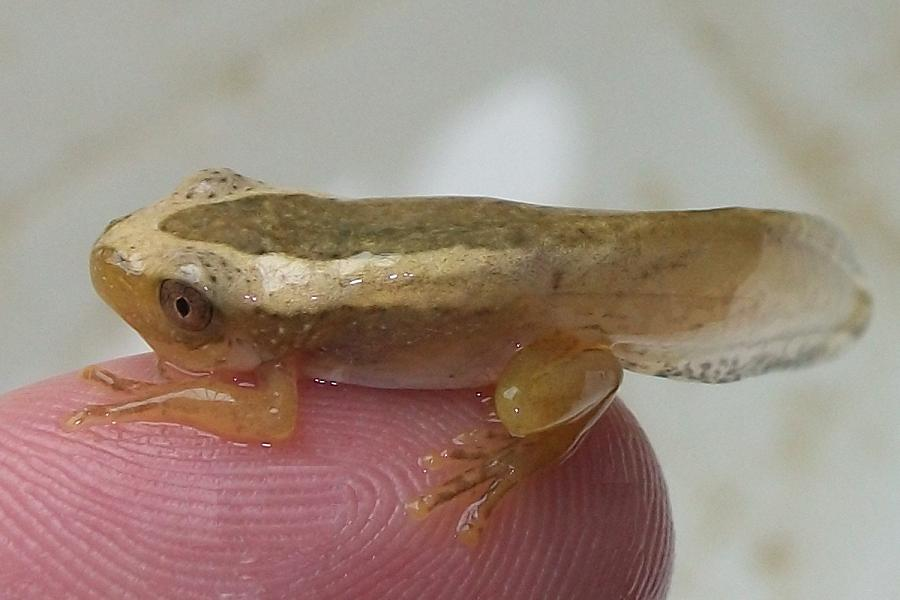
Tadpole/ froglet taken out of the water
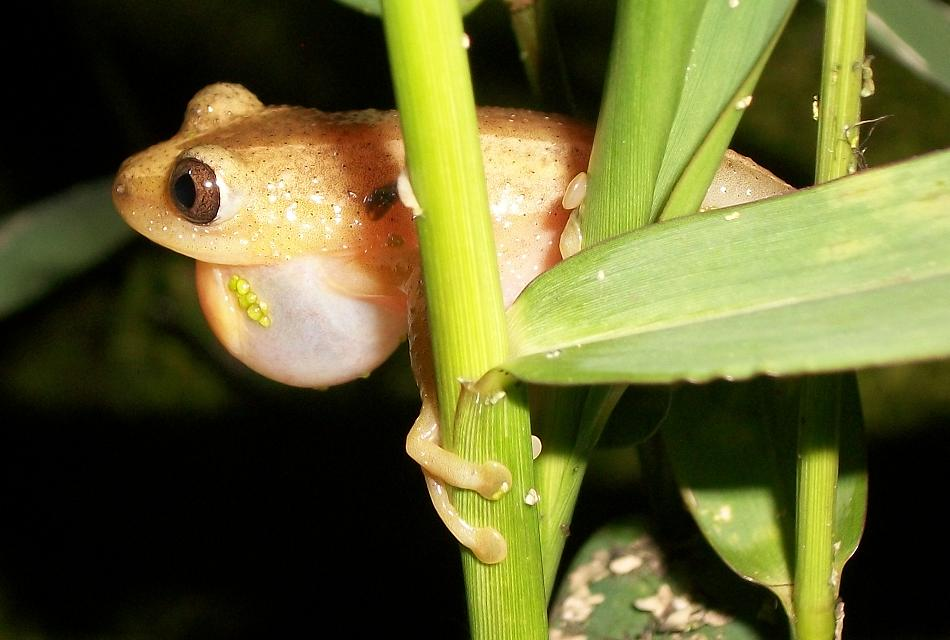
Adult with throat-sack extended for mating call

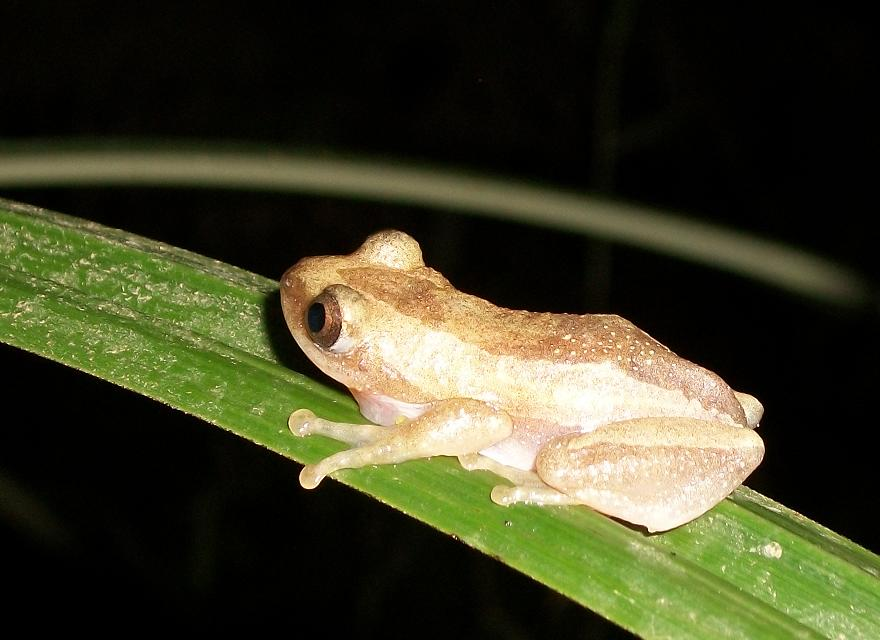
Adult on the leaf of a Giant Sedge (Cyperus dives)

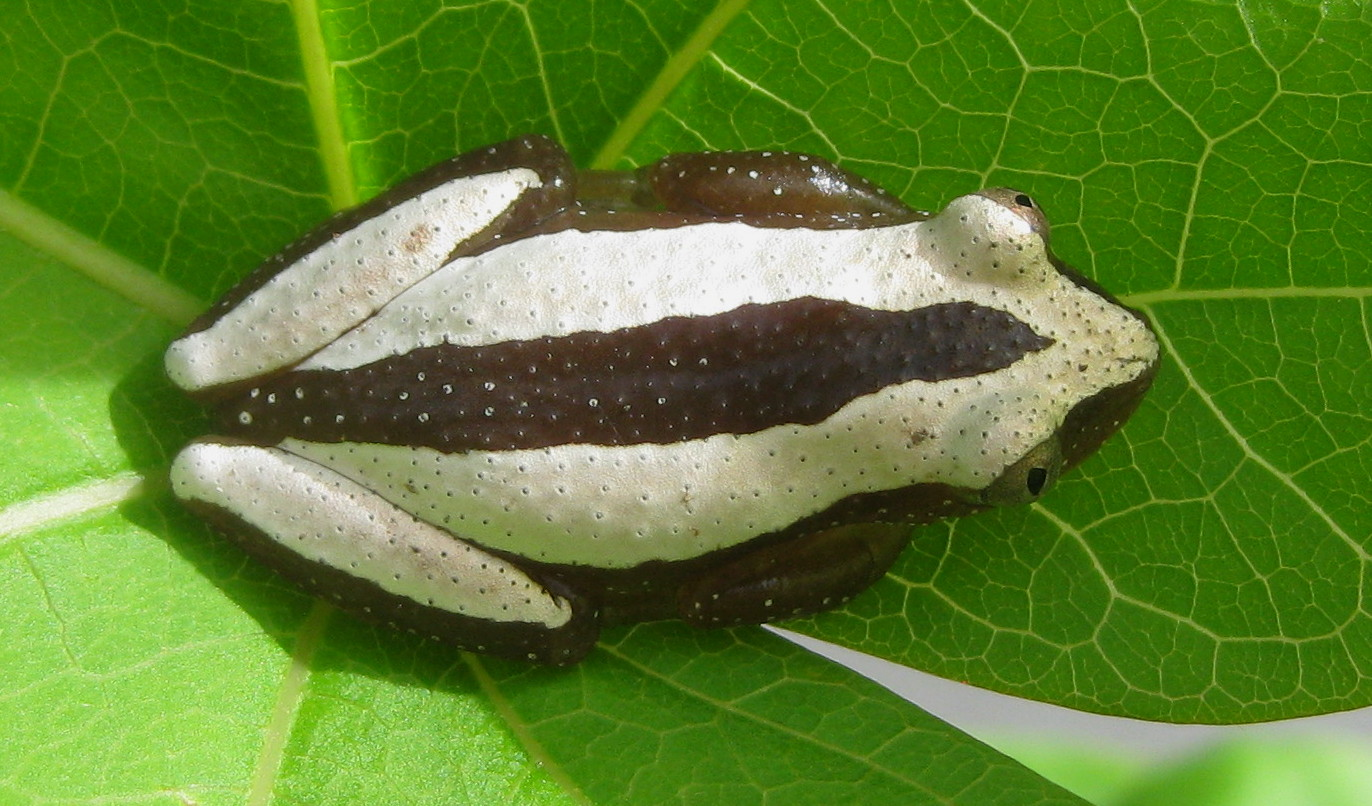
On a leaf of Jatropha curcas
