= Msinsi Community Conservancy =

Nature reserve in Durban, South Africa

Msinsi Community Conservancy is an 8.5-hectare (21-acre) sandstone sourveld grasslands reserve in Kloof, Durban, KwaZulu-Natal, South Africa. The park is managed by the Kloof Conservancy, a community organisation that promotes conservation of natural heritage.

== Flora and fauna ==
The rare foxglove orchid is found in the grassland, while in the forest section two endangered frog species occur: the Kloof frog and the Natal leaf-folding frog.
