= Afrixalus equatorialis =

Conservation status
- Least Concern (IUCN 3.1)

Scientific classification
- Kingdom: Animalia
- Phylum: Chordata
- Class: Amphibia
- Order: Anura
- Family: Hyperoliidae
- Genus: Afrixalus
- Species: A. equatorialis

Binomial name
- Afrixalus equatorialis (Laurent, 1941)

Synonyms
- Megalixalus equatorialis Laurent, 1941; Megalixalus fornasinii equatorialis — Laurent, 1946

Species of amphibian

Afrixalus equatorialis, also known as the Congo banana frog, is a species of frog in the family Hyperoliidae. It is found in the central parts of the Congo Basin in the Democratic Republic of the Congo and south-eastern Cameroon, and is likely to be found in the Republic of the Congo and the Central African Republic as well. It might be conspecific with Afrixalus nigeriensis and is closely related to Afrixalus leucostictus.

== Description ==
Adult males measure 25–34 mm (1.0–1.3 in) and adult females 30–38 mm (1.2–1.5 in) in snout–vent length. The dorsal pattern consists of an almost square dark spot. This species is quite similar to Afrixalus nigeriensis from West Africa but lacks the dark lumbar band which is almost always present in the latter species.

The male advertisement call consists of an initial sound and a small number of identical figures with a peak frequency intensity of 2000–2500 Hz, emitted at a rate of 15–20 per second.

== Habitat and conservation ==
Afrixalus equatorialis occurs in lowland rainforest. The Cameroon record is from a swampy forest. Its breeding biology is unknown, but it presumably lays the eggs on leaves above water; the tadpoles fall into the water and develop there.

This species is unlikely to be tolerant of alteration to its habitat. While it can locally be threatened by shifting agriculture, most of its habitat remains intact. It is also present in the Salonga National Park (Democratic Republic of the Congo).
