= Afrixalus sylvaticus =

Conservation status
- Vulnerable (IUCN 3.1)

Scientific classification
- Kingdom: Animalia
- Phylum: Chordata
- Class: Amphibia
- Order: Anura
- Family: Hyperoliidae
- Genus: Afrixalus
- Species: A. sylvaticus

Binomial name
- Afrixalus sylvaticus Schiøtz, 1974

Synonyms
- Afrixalus stuhlmanni sylvaticus (Schiøtz, 1974)

Species of frog

Afrixalus sylvaticus is a species of frog in the family Hyperoliidae. Its common name is forest banana frog or forest spiny reed frog.

It is found in Kenya and Tanzania. Its natural habitats are subtropical or tropical dry forests, subtropical or tropical moist lowland forests, intermittent freshwater marshes, plantations, and heavily degraded former forest. It is threatened by habitat loss.
