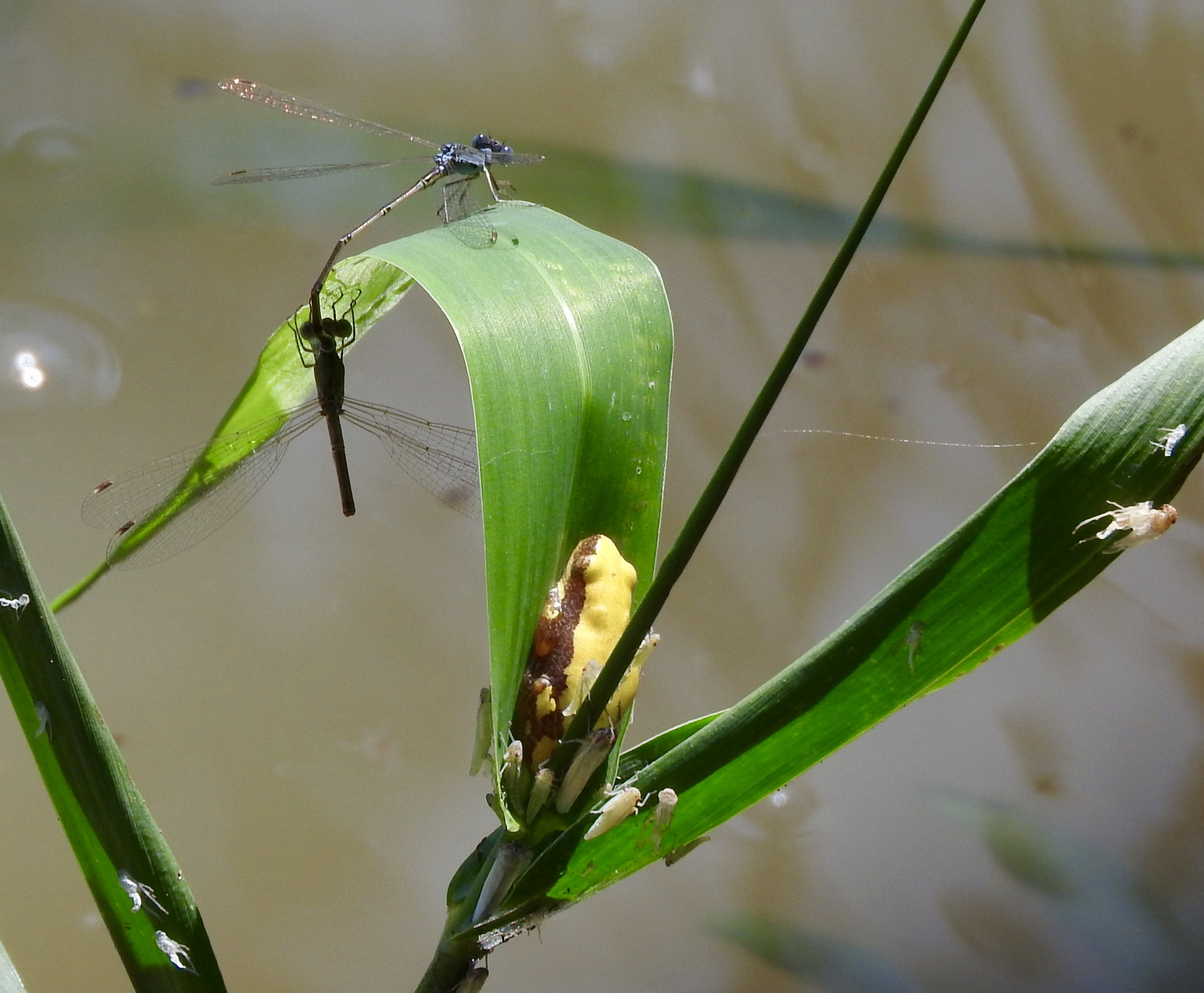

Conservation status
- Least Concern (IUCN 3.1)

Scientific classification
- Kingdom: Animalia
- Phylum: Chordata
- Class: Amphibia
- Order: Anura
- Family: Hyperoliidae
- Genus: Afrixalus
- Species: A. aureus

Binomial name
- Afrixalus aureus Pickersgill, 1984

= Golden banana frog =

Species of amphibian

The golden banana frog, golden dwarf reed frog, golden spiny reed frog, or golden leaf-folding frog (Afrixalus aureus) is a species of frog in the family Hyperoliidae. It is found in lowland coastal plains of eastern South Africa (Mpumalanga and northern KwaZulu-Natal), Eswatini, and southern Mozambique. The AmphibiaWeb includes Afrixalus crotalus in this species as a subspecies, whereas the Amphibian Species of the World and the IUCN Red List of Threatened Species treat A. crotalus as a full species.

== Description ==
Adult males measure 19–24 mm (0.75–0.94 in) and females 22–26 mm (0.87–1.02 in) in snout–vent length. Newly metamorphosed froglets measure about 12 mm (0.47 in).

The snout is tapering. Dorsal asperities are usually strongly developed, while the chest and belly are without asperities. The gular disc is large and granulated. The dorsum varies from light brown to intense golden yellow, with light brown to almost black lumbar patches markings and moderately defined bands along the flanks. The venter is whitish. The concealed areas of the limbs and toes are yellowish. The gular region and gular disc are orange.

== Habitat and conservation ==
The species' natural habitats are savanna, bush land, and grassland at elevations up to 300 m (980 ft) above sea level. Breeding takes place in perennial and ephemeral standing pools and marshes as well as in dense grass at the edges of shallow pans. The eggs are enveloped in vertically folded, glued blades of grass, slightly above the water surface.

It is a very abundant species at its breeding sites. Some populations might be threatened by habitat loss caused by coastal development (including agriculture) and spread of Eucalyptus, leading to drying up of seasonal pans. Some populations might also be impacted by chemical mosquito control.
