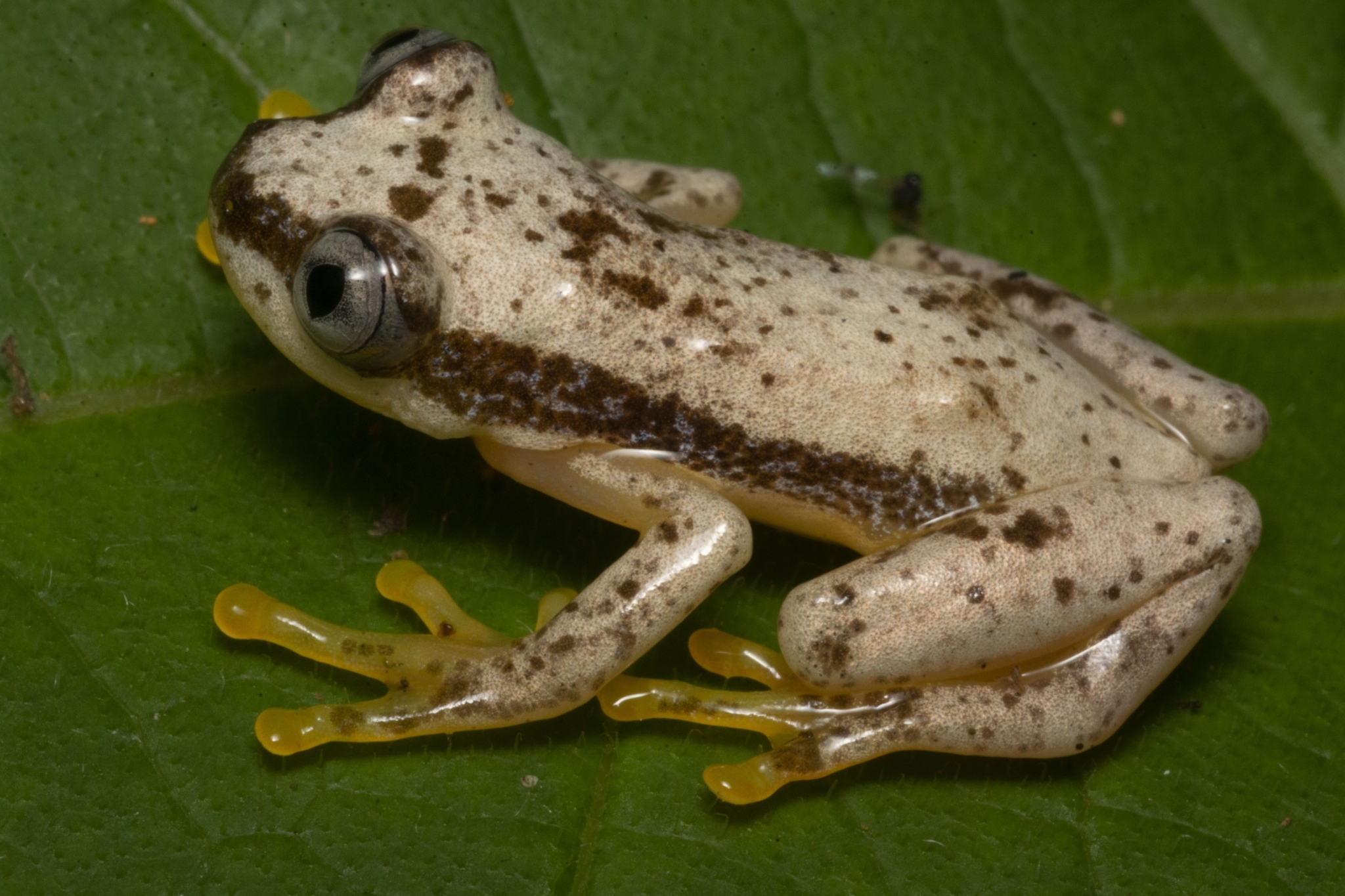

Conservation status
- Vulnerable (IUCN 3.1)

Scientific classification
- Kingdom: Animalia
- Phylum: Chordata
- Class: Amphibia
- Order: Anura
- Family: Hyperoliidae
- Genus: Afrixalus
- Species: A. uluguruensis

Binomial name
- Afrixalus uluguruensis (Barbour and Loveridge, 1928)

Synonyms
- Megalixalus uluguruensis Barbour and Loveridge, 1928

= Afrixalus uluguruensis =

Species of frog

Afrixalus uluguruensis is a species of frog in the family Hyperoliidae. Its common name is Uluguru banana frog. It is endemic to the Eastern Arc Mountains of Tanzania and known from the Kipengere Range (Livingstone Mountains), Mahenge, Udzungwa Scarp, Rubeho, North Uluguru, Nguru, Ukaguru, and Nguu Mountains.

== Etymology ==
The specific name uluguruensis refers to the type locality of this species, Vituri in the Uluguru Mountains.

== Description ==
Males measure 23–25.5 mm (0.91–1.00 in) and females 24–28 mm (0.94–1.10 in) in snout–vent length. The head is broad. The dorsal surfaces are white and have irregular darker spots that rarely form a pattern. Males have fine dorsal spines whereas females are smooth. The males have many small, inconspicuous asperities on the head, dorsum, and limbs. The fingers are about one-third webbed whereas the toes fully webbed.

== Habitat and conservation ==
Its natural habitats are tropical forests at elevations of 600–2,200 m (2,000–7,200 ft) above sea level. Breeding takes place in slow-flowing streams, swampy valley bottoms, and temporary pools in closed-canopy forest. The type series was collected from wild bananas in a rainforest. The diet consists of insects such as beetles.

This species is abundant where it occurs. However, it does not survive in degraded habitats and is threatened by habitat loss caused by agricultural encroachment, logging, and expanding human settlements. It occurs in a number of protected areas: Uluguru Nature Reserve, Udzungwa Mountains National Park, and the proposed Mkingu and Uzungwa Scarp Nature Reserves.
