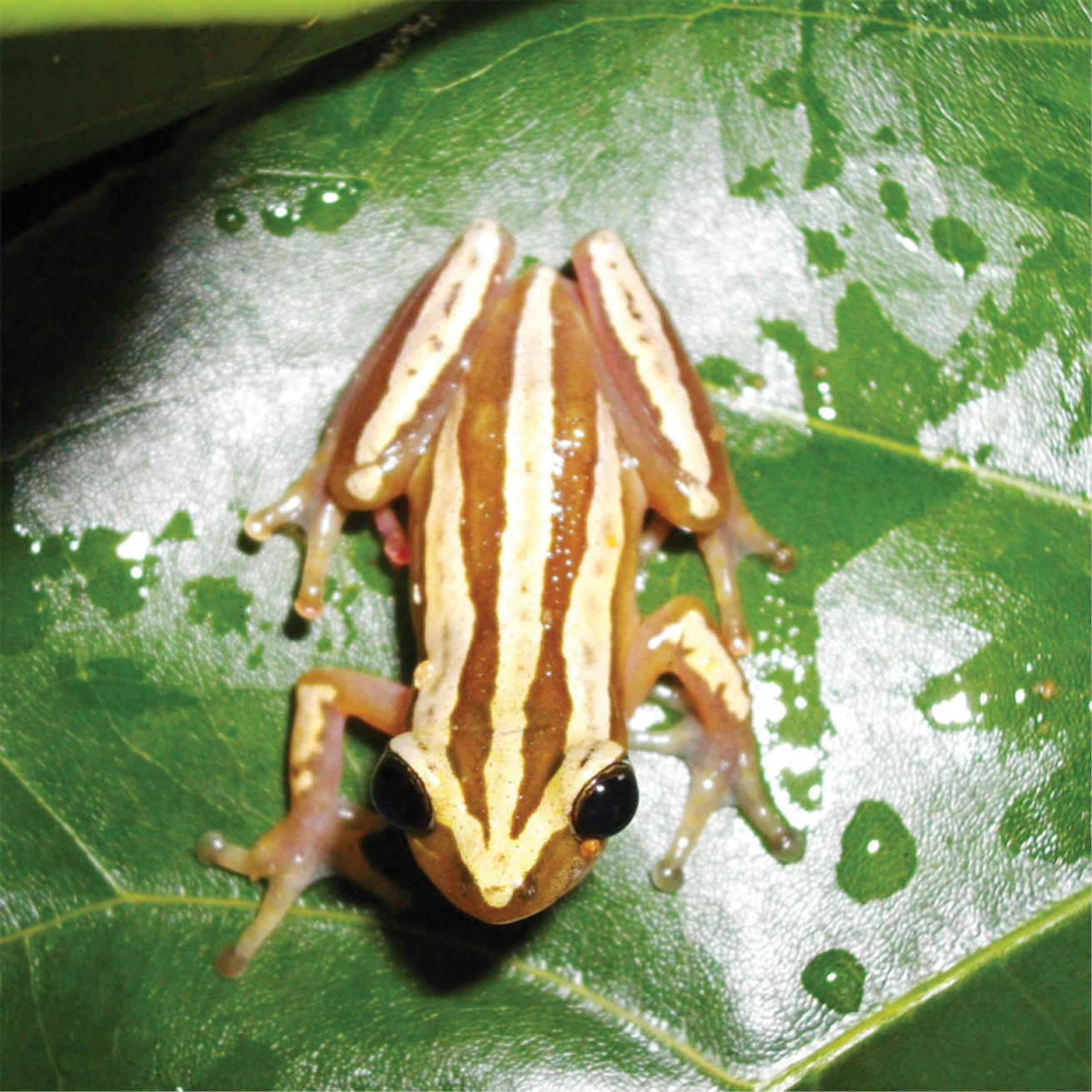

Conservation status
- Least Concern (IUCN 3.1)

Scientific classification
- Kingdom: Animalia
- Phylum: Chordata
- Class: Amphibia
- Order: Anura
- Family: Hyperoliidae
- Genus: Afrixalus
- Species: A. fulvovittatus

Binomial name
- Afrixalus fulvovittatus (Cope, 1860)

Synonyms
- Afrixalus vittiger Peters, 1876; Hyperolius brevipalmatus Ahl, 1931; Hyperolius leptosomus Peters, 1877

= Banded banana frog =

Species of amphibian

The banded banana frog (Afrixalus fulvovittatus) is a species of frog in the family Hyperoliidae. It is found in Ivory Coast, Ghana, Guinea, Liberia, and Sierra Leone. Its natural habitats are moist savanna, swamps, freshwater marshes, intermittent freshwater marshes, plantations, rural gardens, and heavily degraded former forest. It is threatened by habitat loss.

== Habitat ==
The Banded banana frogs natural habitats savanna and wetlands such as degraded former forests, they are not found in primary or secondary forests. Breeding takes place in on folded leaves above water, once hatched tadpoles will fall into the water and develop.

== Bibliography ==
- Channing, A., & Howell K. (2006). Amphibians of East Africa. Comstock books in herpetology. 418 p., [24] p. of plates. Ithaca: Comstock Pub. Associates/Cornell University Press,.
- Zimkus, B. 2012. Afrixalus fulvovittatus. African Amphibians Lifedesk
