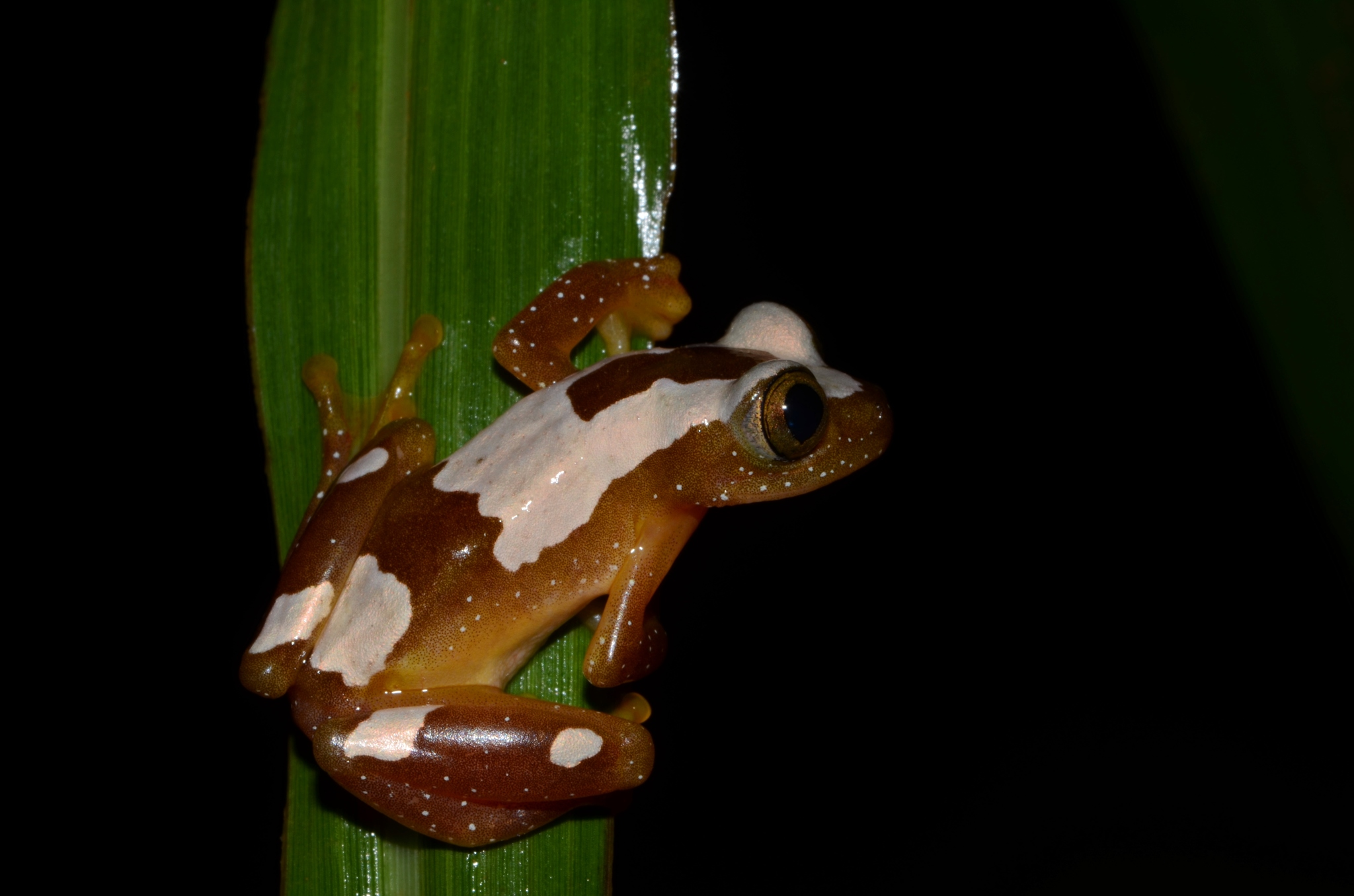

Conservation status
- Least Concern (IUCN 3.1)

Scientific classification
- Kingdom: Animalia
- Phylum: Chordata
- Class: Amphibia
- Order: Anura
- Family: Hyperoliidae
- Genus: Afrixalus
- Species: A. paradorsalis

Binomial name
- Afrixalus paradorsalis Perret, 1960

= Afrixalus paradorsalis =

Species of frog

Afrixalus paradorsalis, also called Foulassi banana frog and the false striped spiny reed frog, is a species of frog in the family Hyperoliidae. It is native to Africa, where it occurs in Cameroon, Equatorial Guinea, Gabon, and Nigeria.

It is widely distributed and occurs in several types of habitat, including disturbed and degraded areas. It lays its eggs on foliage above pools, and the tadpoles drop into the water to develop.

== Habitat ==
The Afrixalus paradorsalis' natural habitats are forests and wetlands such as secondary forest and heavily degraded former forests and are often are found in marshy areas. Breeding takes place on leaves over temporary or permanent ponds once hatched tadpoles will fall into the water and develop.
