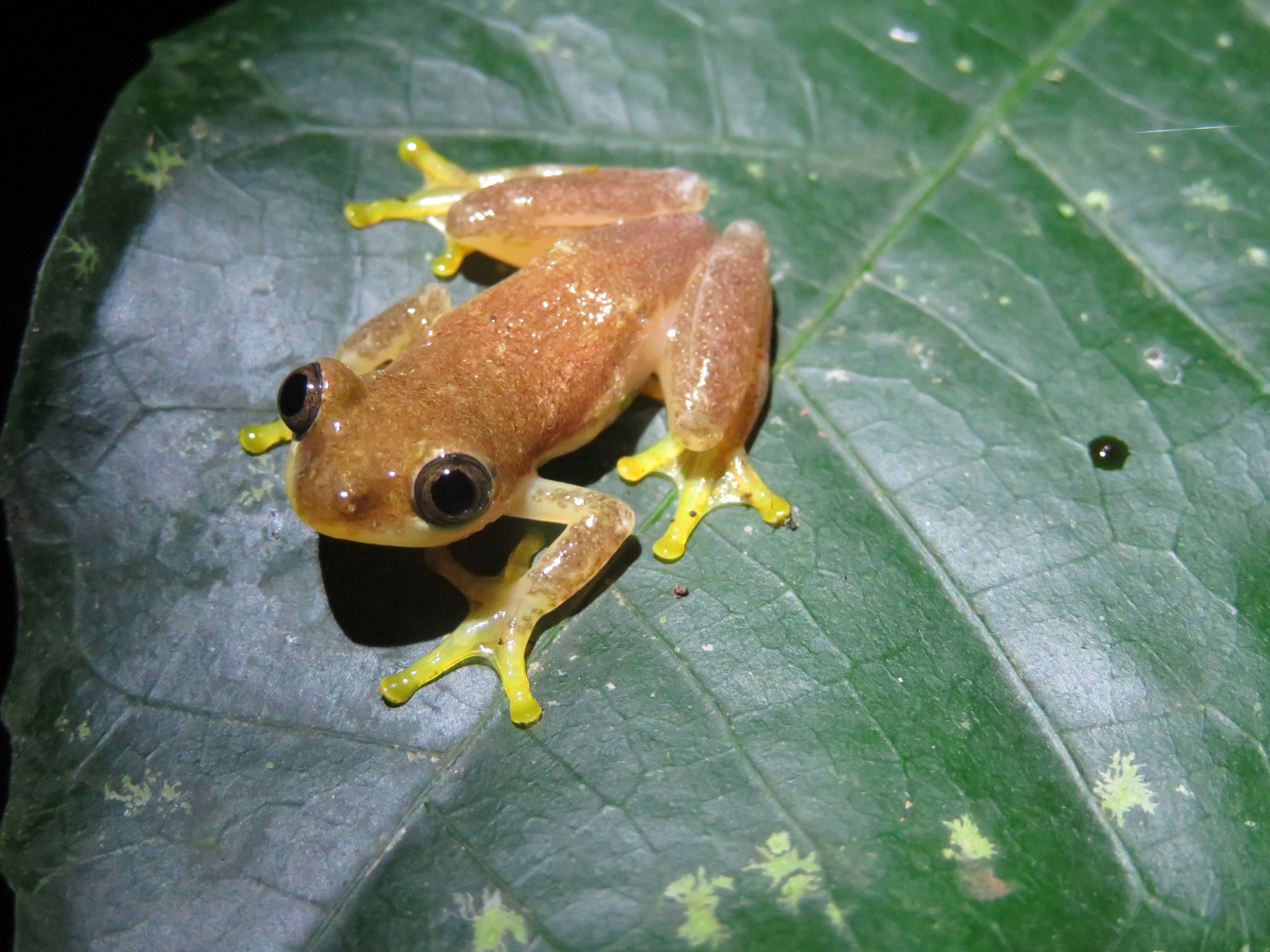

Conservation status
- Endangered (IUCN 3.1)

Scientific classification
- Kingdom: Animalia
- Phylum: Chordata
- Class: Amphibia
- Order: Anura
- Family: Hyperoliidae
- Genus: Afrixalus
- Species: A. dorsimaculatus

Binomial name
- Afrixalus dorsimaculatus (Ahl, 1930)

Synonyms
- Megalixalus dorsimaculatus (Ahl, 1930)

= Afrixalus dorsimaculatus =

Species of frog

Afrixalus dorsimaculatus, commonly called the spotted spiny reed frog, is a species of frog in the family Hyperoliidae, native to the Usambara Mountains of Tanzania.
