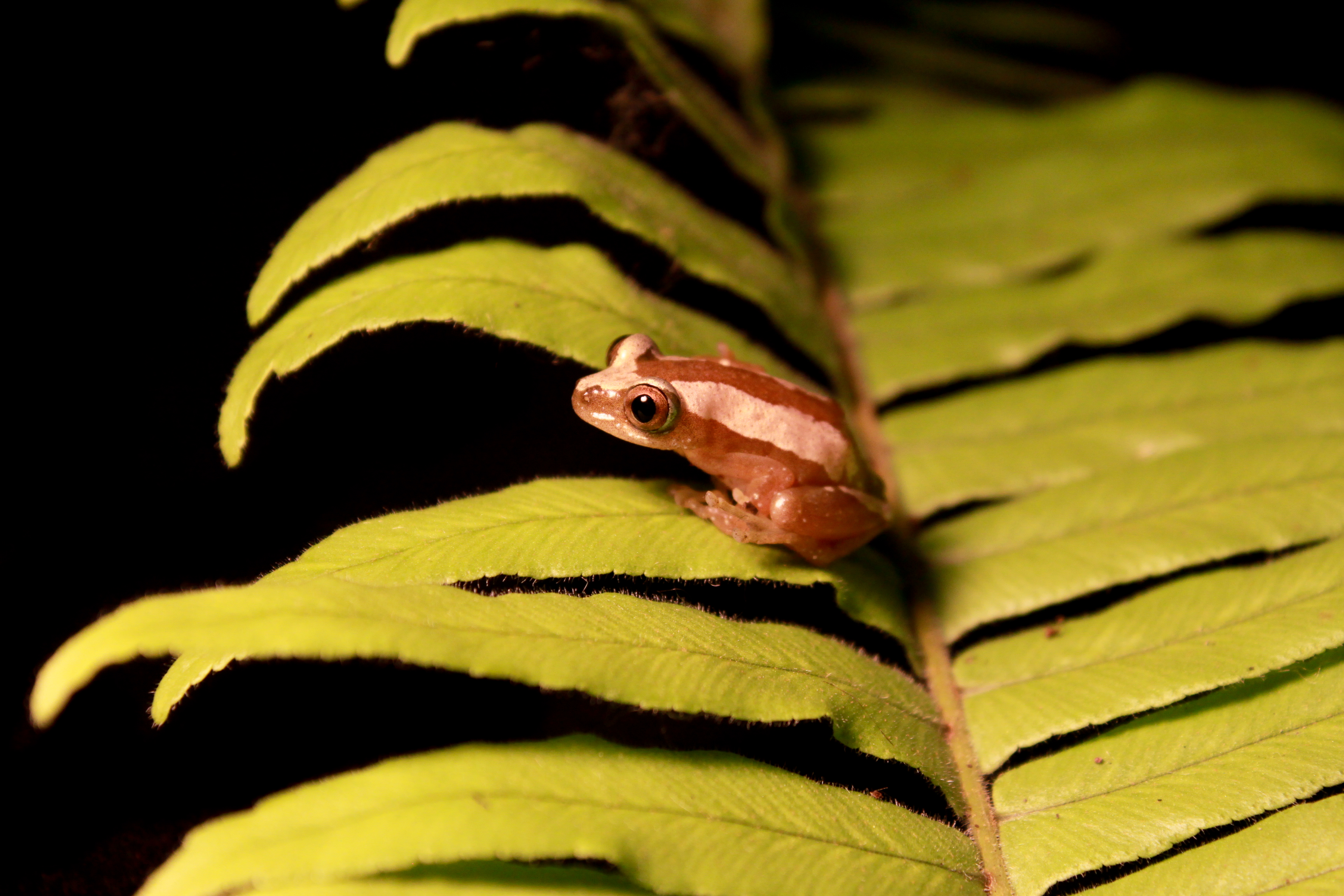

Conservation status
- Least Concern (IUCN 3.1)

Scientific classification
- Kingdom: Animalia
- Phylum: Chordata
- Class: Amphibia
- Order: Anura
- Family: Hyperoliidae
- Genus: Afrixalus
- Species: A. dorsalis

Binomial name
- Afrixalus dorsalis (Peters, 1875)

Synonyms
- Hyperolius dorsalis Peters, 1875

= Brown banana frog =

Species of amphibian

The brown banana frog (Afrixalus dorsalis), also known as the striped spiny reed frog, is an anuran in the family Hyperoliidae.

== Description ==
These frogs have a light to dark brown with a silverish white pattern. These patterns can include a triangle on the tip of the snout, a big stripe leading to the groin, a light spot in the lumbar region, and/or 2 light spots on the tibia.

== Distribution and habitat ==
It is found in Angola, Cameroon, Republic of the Congo, Democratic Republic of the Congo, Ivory Coast, Equatorial Guinea, Gabon, Ghana, Guinea, Liberia, Nigeria, Sierra Leone, and possibly Togo.

Its natural habitats are subtropical or tropical moist lowland forests, subtropical or tropical moist shrubland, subtropical or tropical seasonally wet or flooded lowland grassland, freshwater marshes, intermittent freshwater marshes, rural gardens, heavily degraded former forest, ponds, seasonally flooded agricultural land, and canals and ditches.

== Conservation ==
All anurans of the region are under pressure from habitat destruction and the expanding human population; moreover, an extended period of warfare and instability in Angola has hindered regional conservation efforts. However, this species may be one of the few beneficiaries of widespread deforestation, since it thrives in grasslands and degraded former forests.

A high prevalence of Batrachochytrium, the fungus causing chytridiomycosis that has been associated with amphibian declines elsewhere, has been demonstrated in specimens collected from the Okomu National Park in Nigeria.

== Lifespan ==
This frog's lifespan is unknown.
