= Afrixalus lindholmi =

Conservation status
- Data Deficient (IUCN 3.1)

Scientific classification
- Kingdom: Animalia
- Phylum: Chordata
- Class: Amphibia
- Order: Anura
- Family: Hyperoliidae
- Genus: Afrixalus
- Species: A. lindholmi

Binomial name
- Afrixalus lindholmi (Andersson, 1907)

Synonyms
- Megalixalus lindholmi Andersson, 1907

Species of frog

Afrixalus lindholmi is a species of frog in the family Hyperoliidae. It is endemic to Cameroon and only known from the holotype collected in Bibundi, in the coastal area of Mount Cameroon. Its taxonomic validity is in question.

== Etymology ==
The specific name lindholmi honours Wassili Adolfovitch Lindholm, a Russian zoologist, herpetologist, and malacologist. Accordingly, common name Lindholm's Banana frog has been coined for this species.

== Taxonomy and description ==
The holotype is a female measuring 27 mm (1.1 in) in snout–vent length. The tympanum is small but distinct. The specimen resembles a juvenile Leptopelis, but is evidently an adult because it has about one hundred eggs in its ovaries. This number is much higher than is typical for Afrixalus species, and Amiet (2009) suggests that the placement of this species in Afrixalus should be considered incertae sedis only.

Some specimens now recognized as Afrixalus lacteus were allocated to Afrixalus lindholmi before the description of A. lacteus in 1976.
