= Afrixalus schneideri =

Conservation status
- Data Deficient (IUCN 3.1)

Scientific classification
- Kingdom: Animalia
- Phylum: Chordata
- Class: Amphibia
- Order: Anura
- Family: Hyperoliidae
- Genus: Afrixalus
- Species: A. schneideri

Binomial name
- Afrixalus schneideri (Boettger, 1899)

Species of frog

Afrixalus schneideri, also known as Schneider's banana frog, is a species of frog in the family Hyperoliidae. It is endemic to a locality in Cameroon, but has not been found in the wild for many years. It is likely that it is not a valid species.
