= Afrixalus leucostictus =

Conservation status
- Least Concern (IUCN 3.1)

Scientific classification
- Kingdom: Animalia
- Phylum: Chordata
- Class: Amphibia
- Order: Anura
- Family: Hyperoliidae
- Genus: Afrixalus
- Species: A. leucostictus

Binomial name
- Afrixalus leucostictus Laurent, 1950

Species of frog

Afrixalus leucostictus is a species of frog in the family Hyperoliidae. It is endemic to eastern and central Democratic Republic of the Congo. Its relationship with Afrixalus equatorialis is not fully understood. Common names Makese banana frog and speckled spiny reed frog have been proposed for it.

== Description ==
Adult males measure 27–32 mm (1.1–1.3 in) and adult females 25–36 mm (1.0–1.4 in) in snout–vent length. The snout is relatively short. The dorsal pattern varies from nearly absent to quite contrasting, but less so than in A. equatorialis (notice that the contrast is known to vary with light and humidity). The ventrum is greyish or violet; the gular disc might be yellowish. The tibia lack pattern.

== Habitat and conservation ==
Afrixalus leucostictus inhabits in dense forests at elevations of 750–1,000 m (2,460–3,280 ft) above sea level. It is associated with stagnant pools, its presumed breeding habitat.

A. leucostictus is a poorly known but widely distributed species. It is not threatened overall, although local populations probably suffer from habitat loss caused by agricultural encroachment, expanding human settlements, and wood extraction. It is present at least in the Virunga National Park.
