= Afrixalus orophilus =

Conservation status
- Least Concern (IUCN 3.1)

Scientific classification
- Kingdom: Animalia
- Phylum: Chordata
- Class: Amphibia
- Order: Anura
- Family: Hyperoliidae
- Genus: Afrixalus
- Species: A. orophilus

Binomial name
- Afrixalus orophilus (Laurent, 1947)

Synonyms
- Megalixalus orophilus Laurent, 1947

Species of frog

Afrixalus orophilus is a species of frog in the family Hyperoliidae. It is found in Kivu in the eastern Democratic Republic of the Congo, Burundi, Rwanda, and southwestern Uganda. Common names Kivu banana frog, montane spiny reed frog, and two-lined leaf-gluing frog has been coined for it.

== Description ==
Adult males measure 19–27 mm (0.7–1.1 in) and adult females 22–27 mm (0.9–1.1 in) in snout–vent length. The dorsum has narrow stripes on lighter background (but showing little contrast to the ground colour) that converge on the head as well as posteriorly.

== Habitat and conservation ==
Afrixalus orophilus occurs in montane grasslands, montane bamboo forests, and in wetland areas in reeds and papyrus, probably largely higher than 1,500 m (4,900 ft) above sea level; its specific habitat requirements are not well known.

Knowledge on the population status of this species is sketchy; there are some recent records, but it has not been found again at its type locality, despite recent surveys. It is probably impacted by ongoing loss of habitat caused by agriculture and human settlements. Also pet trade and mining could be threats. It is present in the Bwindi National Park in Uganda and in the Virunga National Park in the Democratic Republic of Congo, although presently the latter is not effectively managed.
