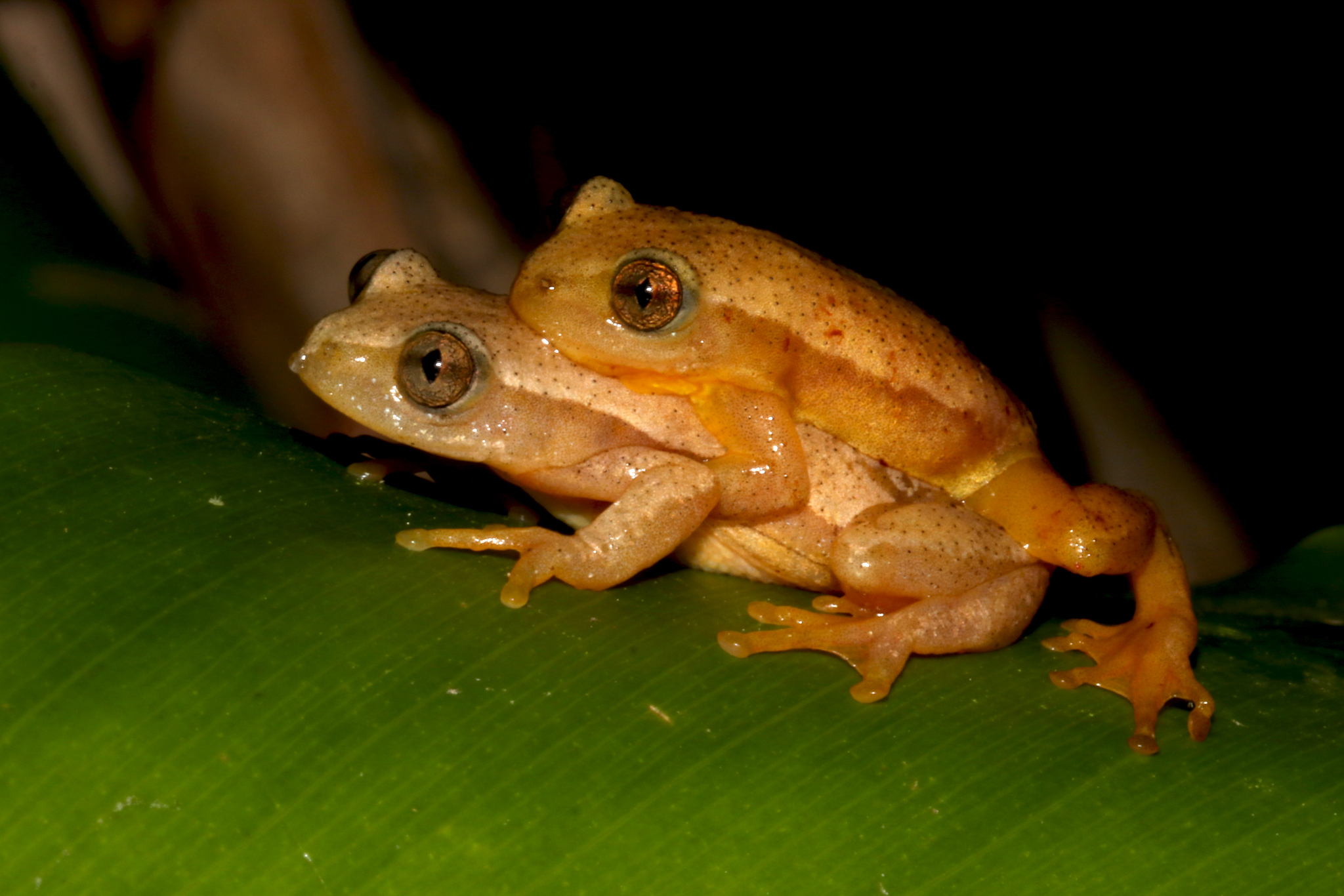

Conservation status
- Endangered (IUCN 3.1)

Scientific classification
- Kingdom: Animalia
- Phylum: Chordata
- Class: Amphibia
- Order: Anura
- Family: Hyperoliidae
- Genus: Afrixalus
- Species: A. knysnae

Binomial name
- Afrixalus knysnae (Loveridge, 1954)

Synonyms
- Hyperolius knysnae Loveridge, 1954; Afrixalus brachycnemis knysnae Poynton, 1964

= Knysna banana frog =

Species of amphibian

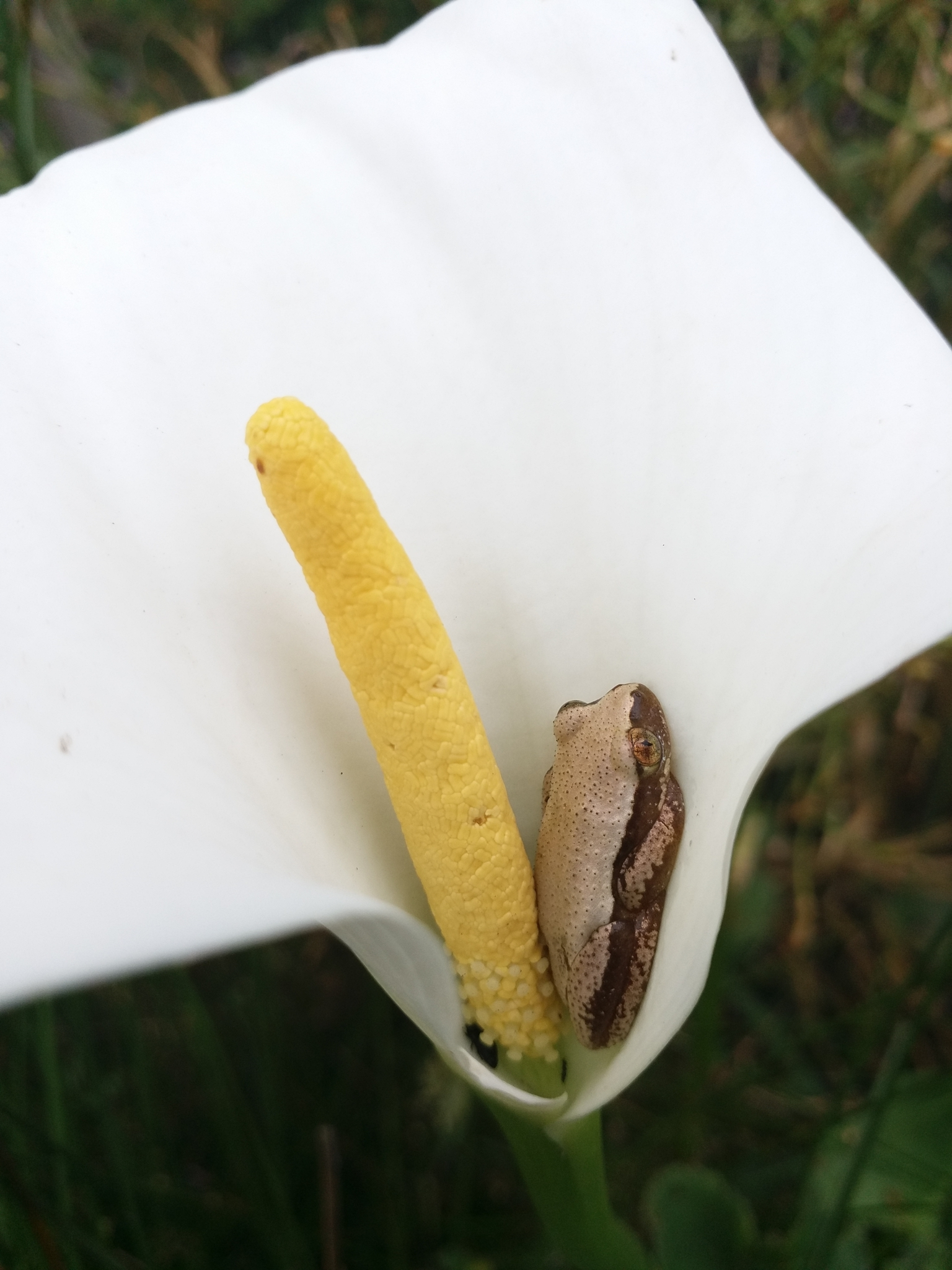
Afrixalus knysnae

The Knysna banana frog, also called Knysna leaf-folding frog or Knysna spiny reed frog (Afrixalus knysnae), is a species of frog in the family Hyperoliidae endemic to South Africa.

== Habitat ==
Its natural habitats are temperate forests, Mediterranean-type shrubby vegetation, freshwater marshes, intermittent freshwater marshes, arable land, water storage areas, and ponds. It is threatened by habitat loss.

The Knysna banana frog is a species known from around 7 locations at low altitude (< 250 m asl) on the south coast of South Africa on either side of the border between the Eastern Cape and Western Cape provinces. To the extent of scientists knowledge we know that the occurrence rate is 1,756 km². The area of occupancy has not been formally calculated but is known to be declining as some sites (like Covie) are presumed lost as no adults or tadpoles have been found there for at least three years. Although some sites are pristine, others are threatened by alien vegetation. Banana frogs are native to South Africa (Eastern Cape Province, Western Cape Province).

They live in coastal mosaic of vegetation types, including mountain fynbos heathland, and forest. The frogs breed in small dams and shallow semi-permanent water with much emergent vegetation and even in well vegetated ornamental garden ponds; it is suspected that this species requires high water quality for breeding.

Habitat is declining due to encroachment by urban development, alien invasive vegetation and chemical pollution. Species in this genus deposit between 20 and 50 eggs on vegetation above the water. Tadpoles emerge, drop into the water and remain there until metamorphosis.

== Identification ==
The Knysna banana frog has a creamy and yellow color with lateral brown stripes. Females have a smoother texture than males.

== Population ==
As of 2026, the population appears to be stable. However, the three subpopulations of this species are severely fragmented. The subpopulation occurring near George, South Africa is expected to contain more than half of the remaining individuals of the species.

An additional subpopulation at Covie, South Africa was rediscovered in 2011 after suspicions it had gone extinct.

The main threat is habitat loss due to urban and recreational development, afforestation, invasive vegetation, agricultural expansion and chemical pollution. These threats are likely to act locally on breeding sites. Droughts may cause additional stresses for this species.

== Diet ==
Adults of the species forage at night, when they pick insects from aquatic vegetation. Tadpoles eat vegetation within the body of water where they hatch.

== Sources ==
- Bergmann, Travis; Zimkus, Breda; Gale Rosen, Daniel. 2012. Afrixalus knysnae. African Amphibians Lifedesk
