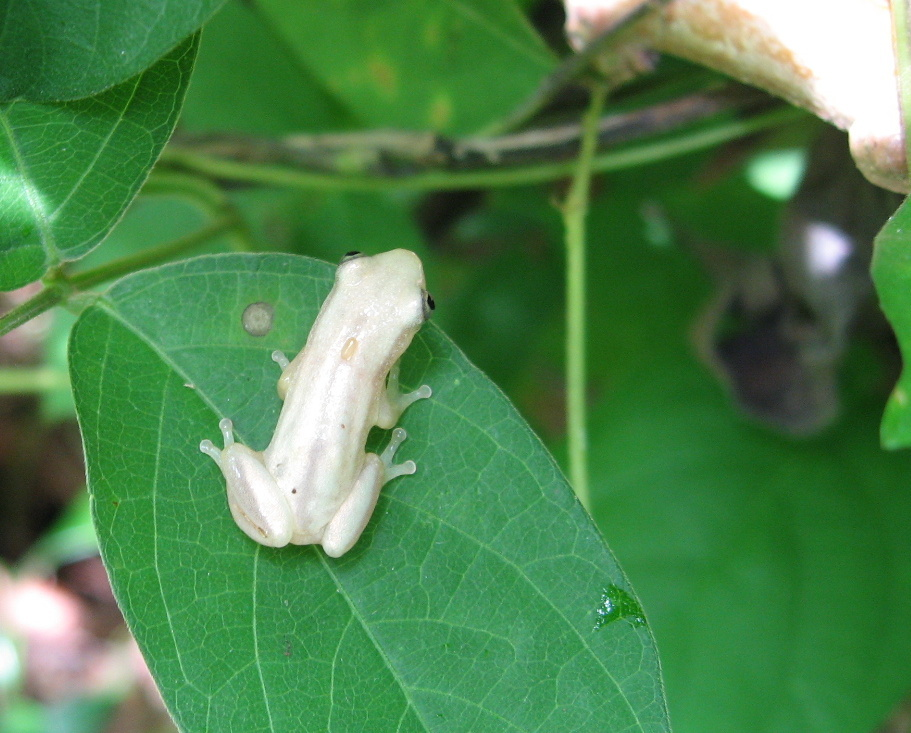

Conservation status
- Least Concern (IUCN 3.1)

Scientific classification
- Kingdom: Animalia
- Phylum: Chordata
- Class: Amphibia
- Order: Anura
- Family: Hyperoliidae
- Genus: Afrixalus
- Species: A. weidholzi

Binomial name
- Afrixalus weidholzi (Mertens, 1938)

Synonyms
- Megalixalus weidholzi Mertens, 1938, Megalixalus schoutedeni Laurent, 1941; Afrixalus schoutedeni (Laurent, 1941)

= Afrixalus weidholzi =

Species of amphibian

Afrixalus weidholzi is a species of frogs in the family Hyperoliidae. Its common name is Weidholz's banana frog or Weidholz's leaf-folding frog.

== Distribution ==
This species is widely distributed in savannas between Gambia and Senegal in the west and east to the northeastern Democratic Republic of Congo (on the South Sudanese border), but its distribution is patchy. This probably reflects the lack of herpetological work in its general distribution area. The International Union for Conservation of Nature (IUCN) lists the following countries in the confirmed distribution (from west to east): the Gambia, Senegal, Sierra Leone, Mali, Ivory Coast, Ghana, Togo, Benin, Nigeria, Cameroon, Democratic Republic of the Congo, and South Sudan. Furthermore, it is expected to occur in many intervening countries (Guinea, Guinea-Bissau, Liberia, Burkina Faso, Chad, and Sudan).

== Etymology ==
The specific name weidholzi honours Alfred Weidholz, an Austrian wildlife dealer, explorer, and traveler.

== Description ==
Afrixalus weidholzi is a small species: adult measure 18–23 mm (0.71–0.91 in) in snout–vent length. The dorsum is whitish to yellow and has a thin, dark vertebral line, at least posteriorly. There is also a broader, dark lateral stripe running from the tip of snout to the groin.

=== Reproduction ===
The males call from dense, low grass that grow on soils flooded by a few centimetres of water. The advertisement call is quiet, high-pitched buzzing. The eggs are placed in small batches in transversally folded grass leaves, glued together by jelly. The newly metamorphosed froglets measure 10.5 mm (0.41 in).

== Habitat and conservation ==
Its natural habitats are both dense moist and open dry savannas. Breeding takes place in temporary ponds. It probably tolerates some habitat alteration. It is adversely affected by overgrazing in its habitat, but this is a localized threat only. It can be locally very common, is somewhat tolerant of habitat disturbance, and is not considered threatened. It occurs in the Kyabobo National Park in Ghana, and probably in several other protected areas.
