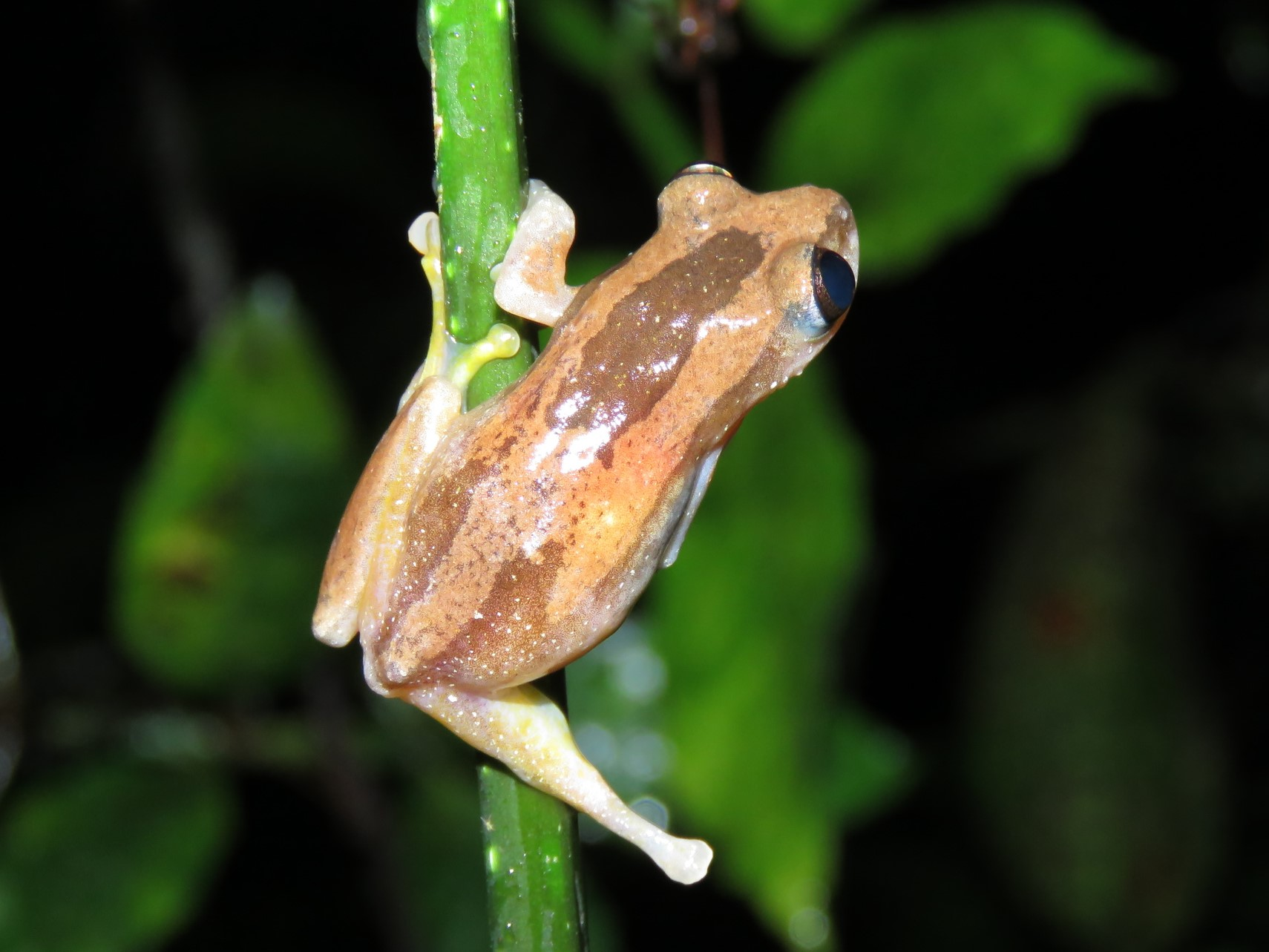

Conservation status
- Least Concern (IUCN 3.1)

Scientific classification
- Kingdom: Animalia
- Phylum: Chordata
- Class: Amphibia
- Order: Anura
- Family: Hyperoliidae
- Genus: Afrixalus
- Species: A. osorioi

Binomial name
- Afrixalus osorioi (Ferreira, 1906)

Synonyms
- Rappia osorioi Ferreira, 1906; Hyperolius osorioi (Ferreira, 1906); Megalixalus fornasinii congicus Laurent, 1941; Afrixalus osorioi congicus (Laurent, 1941)

= Afrixalus osorioi =

Species of frog

Afrixalus osorioi is a species of frog in the family Hyperoliidae. It is found in Angola, Democratic Republic of the Congo, Gabon, western Kenya, and Uganda. The specific name osorioi honours Balthazar Osório, a Portuguese ichthyologist. Its common names include Angola banana frog, Osorio's spiny reed frog, Congro spiny reed frog, and forest tree frog.

== Description ==
Adult males measure around 27–31 mm (1.1–1.2 in) and adult females 32–35 mm (1.3–1.4 in) in snout–vent length. They have a light and dark brown dorsal pattern that normally include a rectangular dark dorsal spot and which extends to the anus. Males have small, scattered, and inconspicuous asperities on the dorsal surfaces of head, body, and limbs. The tibia have light upper side.

The male advertisement call consists of a series of clicks emitted at a rate of 18–30 per second.

== Habitat and conservation ==
Afrixalus osorioi occurs in degraded secondary forests and heavily degraded former forests (including farm bush) of the central African rainforest belt. Breeding takes place in small temporary and permanent water bodies with overhanging vegetation. They also use artificial water bodies such as old drums. It is an abundant and adaptable species that is unlikely to face significant threats. It occurs in several protected areas.
