= Ethiopian banana frog =

Conservation status
- Vulnerable (IUCN 3.1)

Scientific classification
- Kingdom: Animalia
- Phylum: Chordata
- Class: Amphibia
- Order: Anura
- Family: Hyperoliidae
- Genus: Afrixalus
- Species: A. enseticola

Binomial name
- Afrixalus enseticola Largen, 1974

Species of amphibian

The Ethiopian banana frog (Afrixalus enseticola), also known as the Bonga banana frog, is a small species of frog that is endemic to Ethiopia. They live in altitudes of 1,700–2,750 m (5,580–9,020 ft) on both sides of the Great Rift Valley in the Ethiopian Highlands. It is classified as "vulnerable" on the IUCN Red List (2004) due to decline of forested habitat in the highlands.

An adult Ethiopian banana frog only reaches a length of 20–28 mm (0.79–1.10 in).

== Habitat ==
The Ethiopian banana frogs natural habitats are montane forest and high altitudes such as elevations up to 2,750 m down to 1,700 m. They can rarely be found in montane grasslands after forest clearance. Breeding takes place in herbaceous vegetation surrounds pools in forest clearings, they require emergent vegetation in marshy pools.
