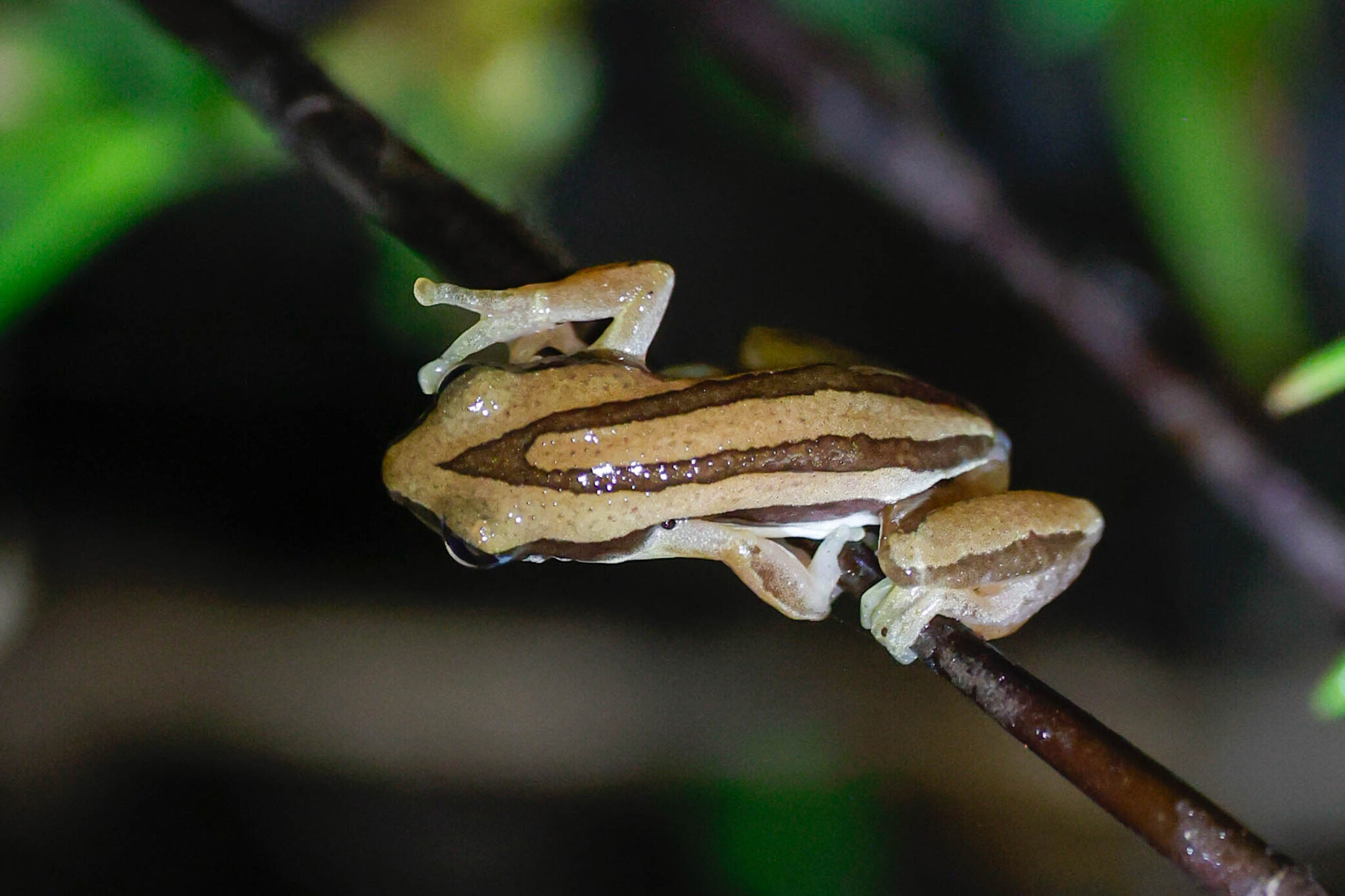

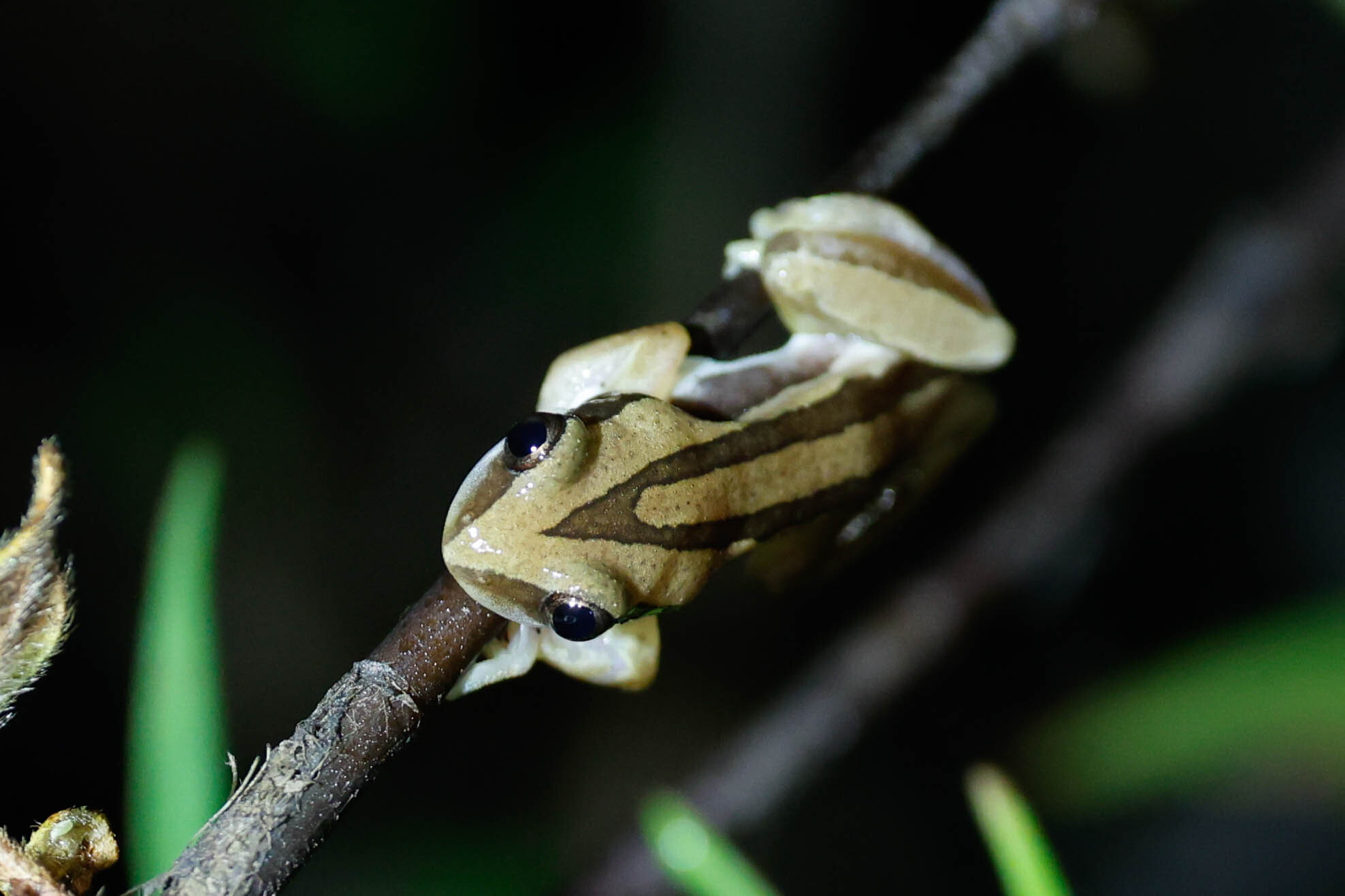

Conservation status
- Least Concern (IUCN 3.1)

Scientific classification
- Kingdom: Animalia
- Phylum: Chordata
- Class: Amphibia
- Order: Anura
- Family: Hyperoliidae
- Genus: Afrixalus
- Species: A. wittei

Binomial name
- Afrixalus wittei (Laurent, 1941)

= Afrixalus wittei =

Species of frog

Afrixalus wittei is a species of frog in the family Hyperoliidae. Its common name is De Witte's spiny reed frog. It is found in Angola, Democratic Republic of the Congo, Tanzania, and Zambia.

Its natural habitats are moist savanna, flooded grassland, marshes, and temporary pools.
