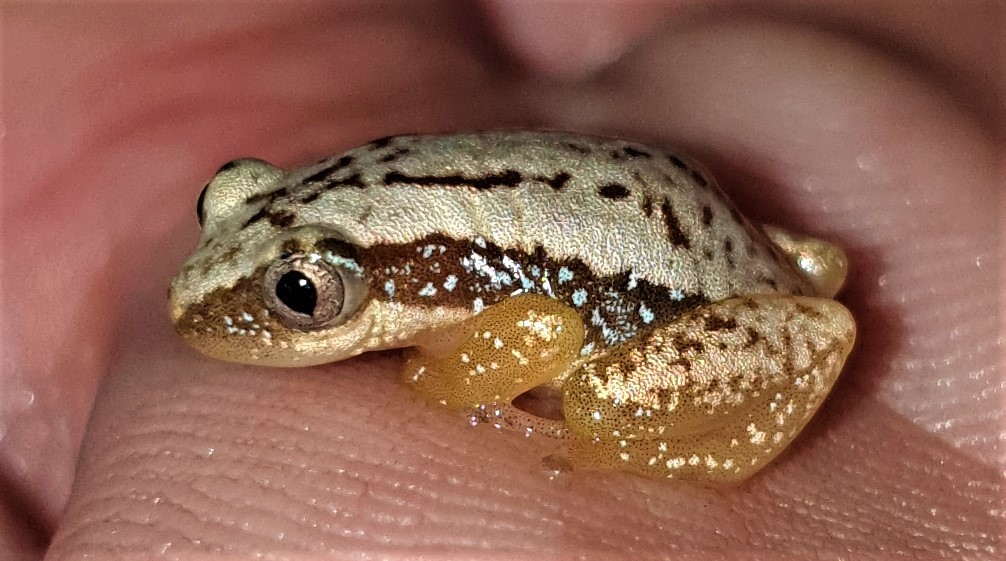

Conservation status
- Least Concern (IUCN 3.1)

Scientific classification
- Kingdom: Animalia
- Phylum: Chordata
- Class: Amphibia
- Order: Anura
- Family: Hyperoliidae
- Genus: Afrixalus
- Species: A. crotalus

Binomial name
- Afrixalus crotalus Pickersgill, 1984

Synonyms
- Afrixalus aureus crotalus Pickersgill, 1984

= Afrixalus crotalus =

Species of amphibian

Afrixalus crotalus is a species of frogs in the family Hyperoliidae. It is found in southern Malawi, central Mozambique, and eastern Zimbabwe. It might be a subspecies of Afrixalus aureus, a position adopted by the AmphibiaWeb. It is sometimes known as the Zimbabwe banana frog or snoring spiny reed frog.

== Description ==
Adult males measure 17–22 mm (0.67–0.87 in) and females 20–24 mm (0.79–0.94 in) in snout–vent length. The snout is tapering. The gular disc is large and usually has small asperities. There are also minute asperities on the head; otherwise, the body has no asperities. Adults usually have a rudimentary mid-dorsal line and para-dorsal stripes. The headspot, usually present among the related species, is very weakly developed.

== Habitat and conservation ==
Afrixalus crotalus inhabit moist savanna and shrubland at low to medium altitudes. Breeding takes place in ephemeral grassy pools, flooded grassland, and marshes. The eggs are laid in folded, glued leaves of vegetation at, and just under, the surface of water.

The species is abundant at suitable locations and tolerates some habitat modification. Some populations might nevertheless be impacted by spreading of agriculture and human settlements and by chemical control of mosquitoes. It occurs in a number of protected areas.
