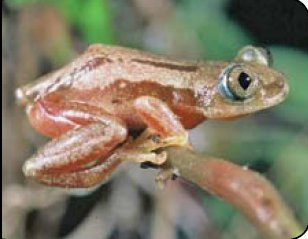

Conservation status
- Vulnerable (IUCN 3.1)

Scientific classification
- Kingdom: Animalia
- Phylum: Chordata
- Class: Amphibia
- Order: Anura
- Family: Hyperoliidae
- Genus: Afrixalus
- Species: A. morerei

Binomial name
- Afrixalus morerei Dubois, 1986

Synonyms
- Afrixalus septentrionalis morerei Dubois, 1986 "1985"; Afrixalus dabagae Pickersgill, 1992

= Afrixalus morerei =

Species of frog

Afrixalus morerei is a species of frog in the family Hyperoliidae. It is endemic to the Udzungwa Mountains in Tanzania. It was originally described as a subspecies of Afrixalus septentrionalis, but is currently recognized as a full species. The specific name morerei honours Jean-Jacques Morère, a French herpetologist from the National Museum of Natural History, Paris. Its common names are Morère's spiny reed frog, Dabaga's leaf-folding frog, and Morere's banana frog.

== Description ==
Adult males measure 21–23 mm (0.8–0.9 in) in snout–vent length. The legs are relatively short. The dorsum is light. A pair of parallel dark dorsolateral lines runs from behind the eye to the groin, merging into the dark lateral bands. There is a brown dot on top of each eye. The middle of tibia have a single brown band.

The male advertisement call is a long, even buzzing.

== Habitat and conservation ==
Afrixalus morerei occurs in marshy areas in open montane grasslands and in grassy glades in forest–grassland mosaic at elevations of 1,300–2,050 m (4,270–6,730 ft) above sea level. It can also occur in pastureland. Its range is poorly known, but it is moderately abundant in suitable habitats. However, its habitats can suffer from afforestation, agricultural expansion, fire, and expanding human settlement. It is not known to occur in protected areas.
