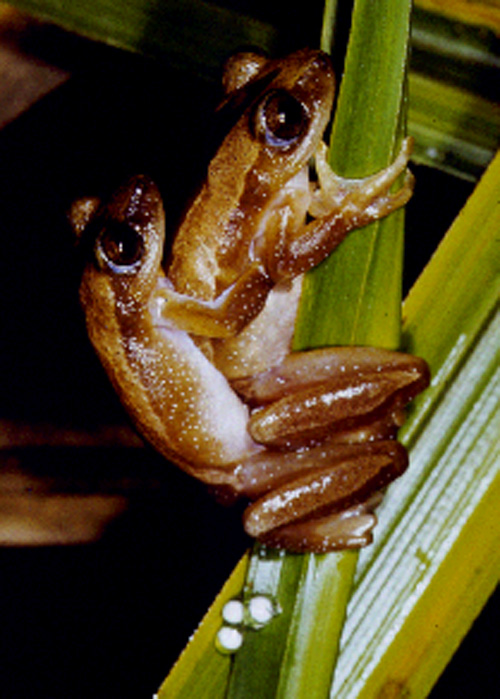
- Afrixalus fornasini

Scientific classification
- Domain: Eukaryota
- Kingdom: Animalia
- Phylum: Chordata
- Class: Amphibia
- Order: Anura
- Family: Hyperoliidae
- Genus: Afrixalus; Laurent, 1944

Type species
- Euchnemis fornasinii Bianconi, 1849 "1848"

Species
- About 35 (see text)

Synonyms
- Laurentixalus Amiet, 2012

= Afrixalus =

Genus of amphibians

Afrixalus, commonly known as the banana frogs, spiny reed frogs, cat's eye reed frogs, or leaf-folding frogs, is a genus of frog in the family Hyperoliidae. They occur in the Subsaharan Africa. They lay their eggs in vegetation above water, often folding leaves around the eggs for protection—hence the common name "leaf-folding frogs".

== Species ==
The following species are recognised in the genus Afrixalus :

- Afrixalus "quadrivittatus" Pickersgill, 2007
- Afrixalus aureus Pickersgill, 1984
- Afrixalus brachycnemis (Boulenger, 1896)
- Afrixalus clarkei Largen, 1974
- Afrixalus crotalus Pickersgill, 1984
- Afrixalus delicatus Pickersgill, 1984
- Afrixalus dorsalis (Peters, 1875)
- Afrixalus dorsimaculatus (Ahl, 1930)
- Afrixalus enseticola Largen, 1974
- Afrixalus equatorialis (Laurent, 1941)
- Afrixalus fornasini (Bianconi, 1849)
- Afrixalus fulvovittatus (Cope, 1861)
- Afrixalus knysnae (Loveridge, 1954)
- Afrixalus lacteus Perret, 1976
- Afrixalus laevis (Ahl, 1930)
- Afrixalus leucostictus Laurent, 1950
- Afrixalus lindholmi (Andersson, 1907)
- Afrixalus manengubensis Amiet, 2009
- Afrixalus morerei Dubois, 1986
- Afrixalus nigeriensis Schiøtz, 1963
- Afrixalus orophilus (Laurent, 1947)
- Afrixalus osorioi (Ferreira, 1906)
- Afrixalus paradorsalis Perret, 1960
- Afrixalus quadrivittatus (Werner, 1908)
- Afrixalus schneideri (Boettger, 1889)
- Afrixalus septentrionalis Schiøtz, 1974
- Afrixalus spinifrons (Cope, 1862)
- Afrixalus stuhlmanni (Pfeffer, 1893)
- Afrixalus sylvaticus Schiøtz, 1974
- Afrixalus uluguruensis (Barbour and Loveridge, 1928)
- Afrixalus upembae (Laurent, 1941)
- Afrixalus vibekensis Schiøtz, 1967
- Afrixalus vittiger (Peters, 1876)
- Afrixalus weidholzi (Mertens, 1938)
- Afrixalus wittei (Laurent, 1941)

The AmphibiaWeb lists 31 species. It does not include Afrixalus "quadrivittatus", and does not recognize Afrixalus brachycnemis as a full species.
