= Afrixalus lacteus =

Conservation status
- Endangered (IUCN 3.1)

Scientific classification
- Kingdom: Animalia
- Phylum: Chordata
- Class: Amphibia
- Order: Anura
- Family: Hyperoliidae
- Genus: Afrixalus
- Species: A. lacteus

Binomial name
- Afrixalus lacteus Perret, 1976

Species of frog

Afrixalus lacteus is a species of frog in the family Hyperoliidae. It is endemic to Cameroon and known from a few mountains in the western part of the country; specifically, it has been recorded from Mount Manengouba (its type locality), Mount Nlonaka, and the southern Bamileke Highlands (Mount Bana, Foto, and Batie). Common name Cameroon banana frog has been coined for it. Prior to its description, it was confused with Afrixalus lindholmi.

== Description ==
Adult males measure 22–27 mm (0.9–1.1 in) and adult females 25–29 mm (1.0–1.1 in) in snout–vent length. The overall appearance is stocky. The fingers are about one-third webbed and the toes are half webbed; both finger and toe tips bear large discs. The colouration varies by the time of the day: during the daytime, the dorsum is almost completely milky white, with few brown chromatophores, whereas at night, there are numerous brown chromatophores and the dorsum may be completely brown. The canthus rostralis is always brown. The thighs, hands, and feet are lemon yellow.

The male advertisement call is a rather quiet, high-pitched buzzing.

== Habitat and conservation ==
Afrixalus lacteus is found in montane forests (including secondary forest and forest edges) and in Raffia palm swamps at elevations of 1,200–1,900 m (3,900–6,200 ft) above sea level. Males call from the canopy of trees close to streams where breeding takes place.

Afrixalus lacteus is an uncommon species known from only few localities. It is threatened by habitat loss and fragmentation associated with agricultural encroachment and collection of wood. On Mount Manengouba a specific threat is deforestation caused by unsustainable harvesting of Prunus africana. Afrixalus lacteus is not known from any protected area.
