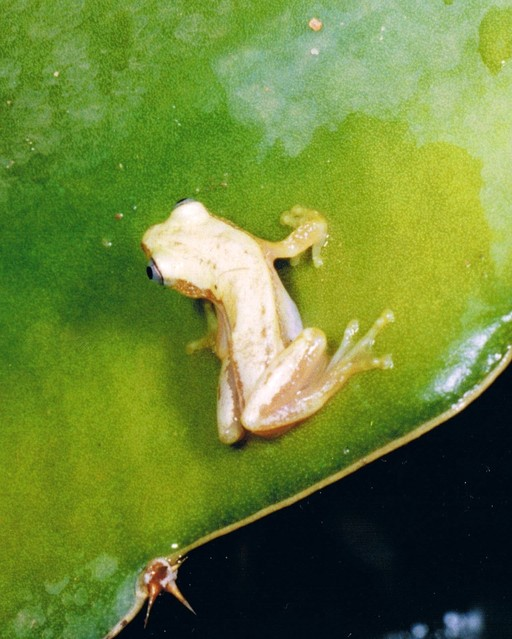

Conservation status
- Least Concern (IUCN 3.1)

Scientific classification
- Kingdom: Animalia
- Phylum: Chordata
- Class: Amphibia
- Order: Anura
- Family: Hyperoliidae
- Genus: Afrixalus
- Species: A. brachycnemis

Binomial name
- Afrixalus brachycnemis (Boulenger, 1896)

Synonyms
- Afrixalus stuhlmanni brachycnemis (Boulenger, 1896)

= Lesser banana frog =

Species of amphibian

The lesser banana frog (Afrixalus brachycnemis) is a species of frog in the family Hyperoliidae.

It is found in Malawi, Mozambique, and Tanzania. Its natural habitats are moist savanna and shrubland, seasonally wet or flooded lowland grassland, swamps, intermittent freshwater marshes, and agricultural land. The species may be slightly impacted by agricultural encroachment and insecticide use.

== Description ==
African lesser banana frogs have transparent skin that can be seen through to reveal their bones.

== Habitat ==
The lesser banana frog's natural habitats are marshes in moist grasslands and savannas at elevations up to 1,400 m and down to 400 m. They can survive in anthropogenic habitats. Breeding takes place in ephemeral ponds with dense peripheral vegetation.
