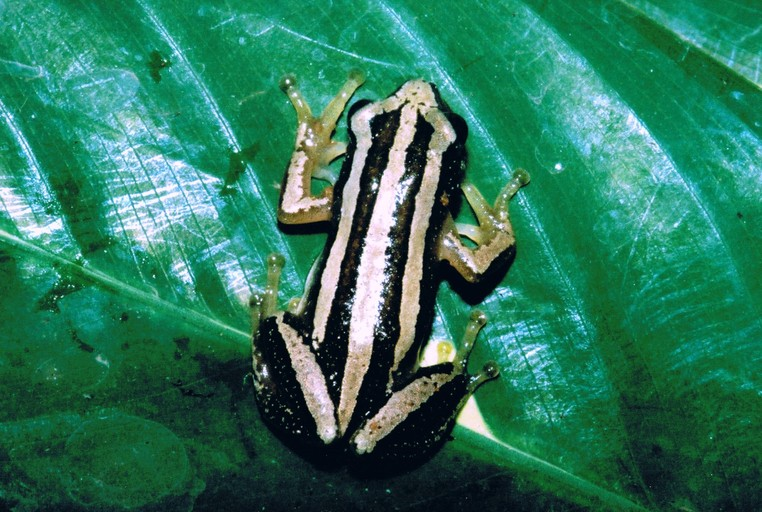

Conservation status
- Least Concern (IUCN 3.1)

Scientific classification
- Kingdom: Animalia
- Phylum: Chordata
- Class: Amphibia
- Order: Anura
- Family: Hyperoliidae
- Genus: Afrixalus
- Species: A. quadrivittatus

Binomial name
- Afrixalus quadrivittatus (Werner, 1908)

= Afrixalus quadrivittatus =

Species of amphibian

Afrixalus quadrivittatus is a species of frogs in the family Hyperoliidae. It is native to central Africa, Republic of Congo, Democratic Republic of Congo, Gabon where it is widely distributed and abundant.

Its natural habitats include moist and dry savanna. It lays its eggs on leaves above pools, and the tadpoles drop into the water when they emerge.

== Habitat ==
The Afrixalus quadrivittatus' natural habitats are savanna, shrubland and wetlands such as moist dry savannas and degraded former. Breeding takes place on leaves over temporary or permanent ponds once hatched tadpoles will fall into the water and develop.
