= Afrixalus stuhlmanni =

Conservation status
- Least Concern (IUCN 3.1)

Scientific classification
- Kingdom: Animalia
- Phylum: Chordata
- Class: Amphibia
- Order: Anura
- Family: Hyperoliidae
- Genus: Afrixalus
- Species: A. stuhlmanni

Binomial name
- Afrixalus stuhlmanni (Pfeffer, 1893)

Species of frog

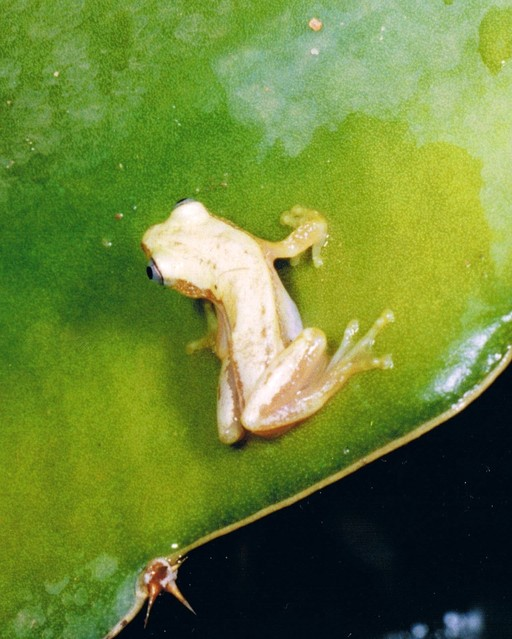
A picture of an Afrixalus stuhlmanni brachycnemis(a species of frog in the family Hyperoliidae)

Afrixalus stuhlmanni is a species of frog in the family Hyperoliidae. It is endemic to Tanzania.

Its natural habitats are moist savanna, subtropical or tropical moist shrubland, shrub-dominated wetlands, swamps, freshwater marshes, arable land, rural gardens, urban areas, heavily degraded former forest, ponds, irrigated land, seasonally flooded agricultural land, and canals and ditches. It can tolerate many types of habitat and is common to abundant in some areas.
