= Nigeria banana frog =

Conservation status
- Least Concern (IUCN 3.1)

Scientific classification
- Kingdom: Animalia
- Phylum: Chordata
- Class: Amphibia
- Order: Anura
- Family: Hyperoliidae
- Genus: Afrixalus
- Species: A. nigeriensis

Binomial name
- Afrixalus nigeriensis Schiøtz, 1963

Species of amphibian

The Nigeria banana frog (Afrixalus nigeriensis) is a species of frog in the family Hyperoliidae. It is found in southeastern Guinea, Liberia, Ivory Coast, Ghana, and western Nigeria; it appears to be missing from Togo and Benin. Its natural habitat is primary rainforests, but it can also be found in a farm bush. The eggs are laid on vegetation, overhanging temporary ponds. It is threatened by habitat loss caused by agricultural encroachment, expanding human settlements, and logging. A high prevalence of Batrachochytrium dendrobatidis, the fungus causing chytridiomycosis, that has been associated with amphibian declines elsewhere, has been demonstrated in specimens collected from the Okomu National Park in Nigeria.

== Habitat ==
The Nigeria banana frogs natural habitats are forests and wetlands such as primary rainforests and regenerating secondary forests in elevations up to 1,000 m down to 0 m. Breeding takes place on leaves over temporary ponds once hatched tadpoles will fall into the water and develop.
