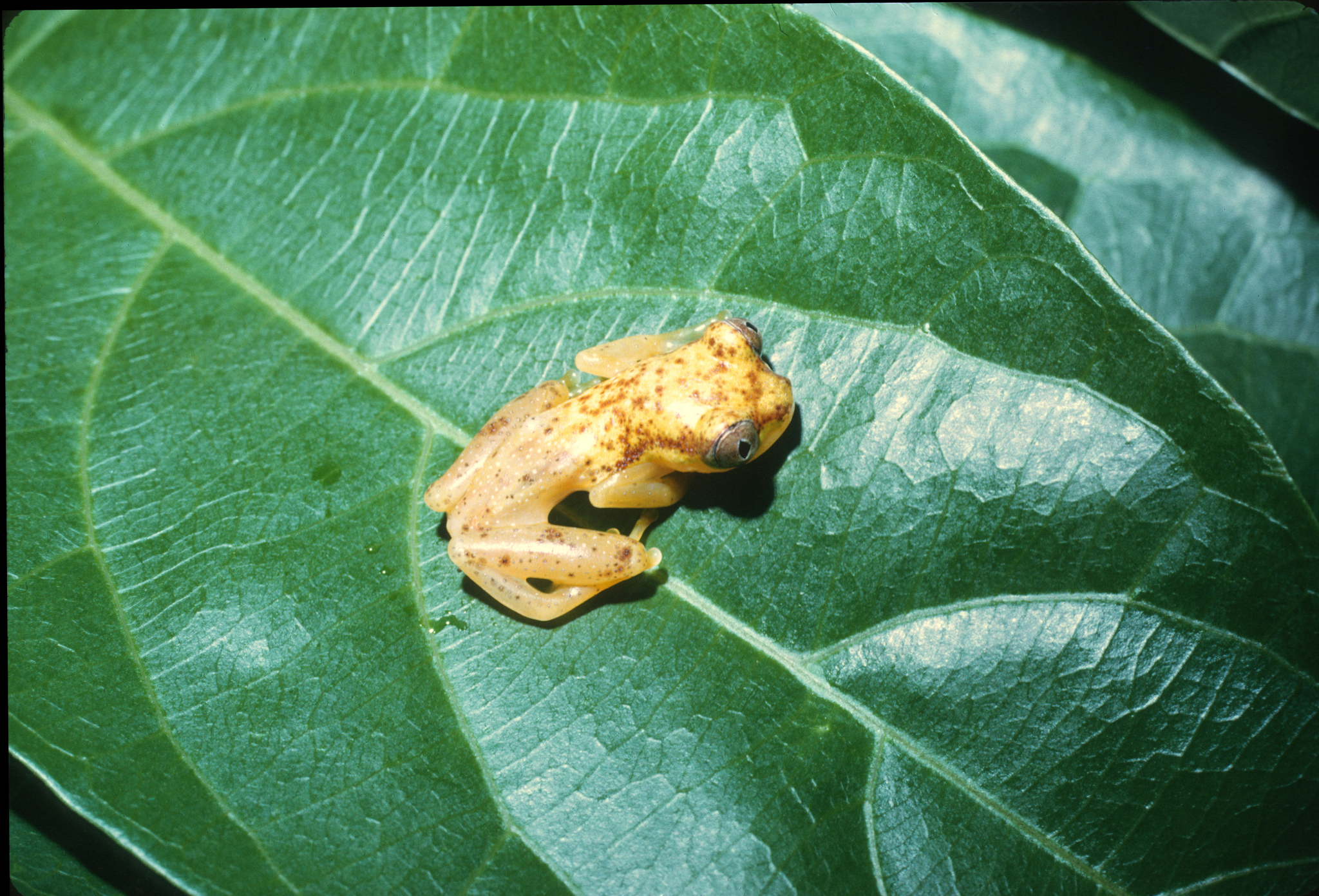

Conservation status
- Least Concern (IUCN 3.1)

Scientific classification
- Kingdom: Animalia
- Phylum: Chordata
- Class: Amphibia
- Order: Anura
- Family: Hyperoliidae
- Genus: Afrixalus
- Species: A. laevis

Binomial name
- Afrixalus laevis (Ahl, 1930)

Synonyms
- Megalixalus laevis Ahl, 1930

= Afrixalus laevis =

Species of frog

Afrixalus laevis is a species of frog in the family Hyperoliidae. It is found in southern Cameroon, northern Gabon, Equatorial Guinea (on the island of Bioko, and expected but not recorded in the mainland part of the country), the Democratic Republic of the Congo, and southwestern Uganda. Its range may extend to the neighboring countries. The common names smooth spiny reed frog and Liberian banana frog have been coined for it.

== Description ==
Adult males measure 20–23 mm (0.8–0.9 in) and adult females 23–25 mm (0.9–1.0 in) in snout–vent length. The head is large and the eyes protruding. The dorsum is translucent posteriorly and yellowish with a varying brown pattern anteriorly. Also the limbs are transparent. There is a brown canthal stripe that continues behind the eye.

The male advertisement call consists of single clacks.

== Habitat and conservation ==
Afrixalus laevis occurs in forest interior. Unusually for Afrixalus , breeding does not take place in standing water: the eggs are deposited on a leaf (without folding it) near flowing water.

Afrixalus laevis is reasonably common in parts of its range. However, it does not occur in modified habitats, and it is locally threatened by the destruction of its forest habitat caused by agricultural encroachment, expanding human settlements, and collection of wood. It occurs in several protected areas.
