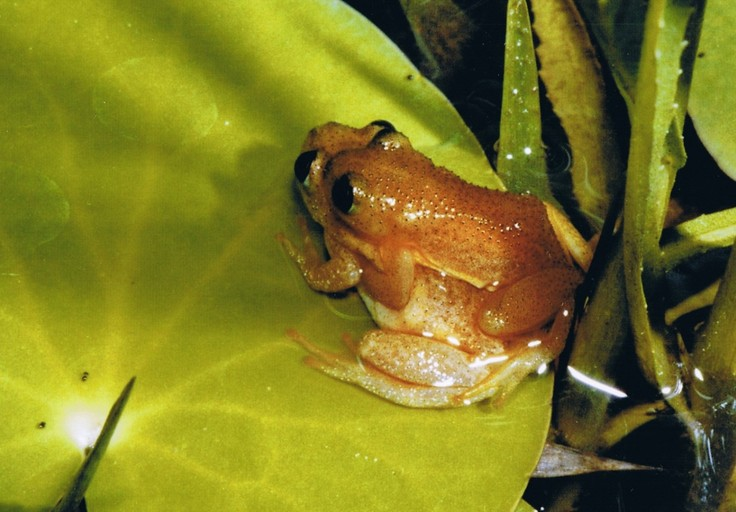

Conservation status
- Least Concern (IUCN 3.1)

Scientific classification
- Kingdom: Animalia
- Phylum: Chordata
- Class: Amphibia
- Order: Anura
- Family: Hyperoliidae
- Genus: Afrixalus
- Species: A. spinifrons

Binomial name
- Afrixalus spinifrons (Cope, 1862)

= Natal banana frog =

Species of amphibian

The Natal banana frog (Afrixalus spinifrons) also known as the Natal Leaf-folding Frog is a species of frog in the family Hyperoliidae. It is found in South Africa and possibly Lesotho. Its natural habitats are temperate forests, temperate shrubland, swamps, intermittent freshwater marshes, arable land, rural gardens, ponds, and canals and ditches. It is threatened by habitat loss.

== Habitat ==
The Natal banana frog's natural habitats are forests, shrubland, and wetlands such as coastal bushveld-grasslands and moist upland grasslands. They have also been found in degraded forests in elevations up to 1,500 m down to 0 m. Breeding takes place in standing water sedge beds and grassy wetlands.
