= Bobiri Butterfly Sanctuary =

Protected area of Ghana

Bobiri Forest Reserve and Butterfly Sanctuary
- Location within Ghana
- Location: Ashanti Region, Ghana
- Nearest city: Kubease
- Coordinates: 6°41′13″N 1°20′38″W
- Area: 54.65 km^{2} (21.10 sq mi)
- Established: 1939

Clerodendrum paniculatum at Bobiri Butterfly Sanctuary

Bobiri Forest Reserve and Butterfly Sanctuary is an ecotourism center in Ghana and the only butterfly sanctuary in West Africa. It has about 400 species of butterflies. It is located on the main Accra - Kumasi Highway at the village of Kubease, about 30 kilometres (19 mi) from Kumasi. It is also about 25 minutes drive from the KNUST. It is enclosed by six communities, these are Krofrom, Kubease, Ndobom, Koforidua, Nkwankwaduam and Tsteteseakasum. Bobiri forest also serves as a research reserve and has one of the highest butterfly counts with different species in Ghana. It was created in 1939 and has an area of 54.65 km^{2} (21.10 sq mi).
