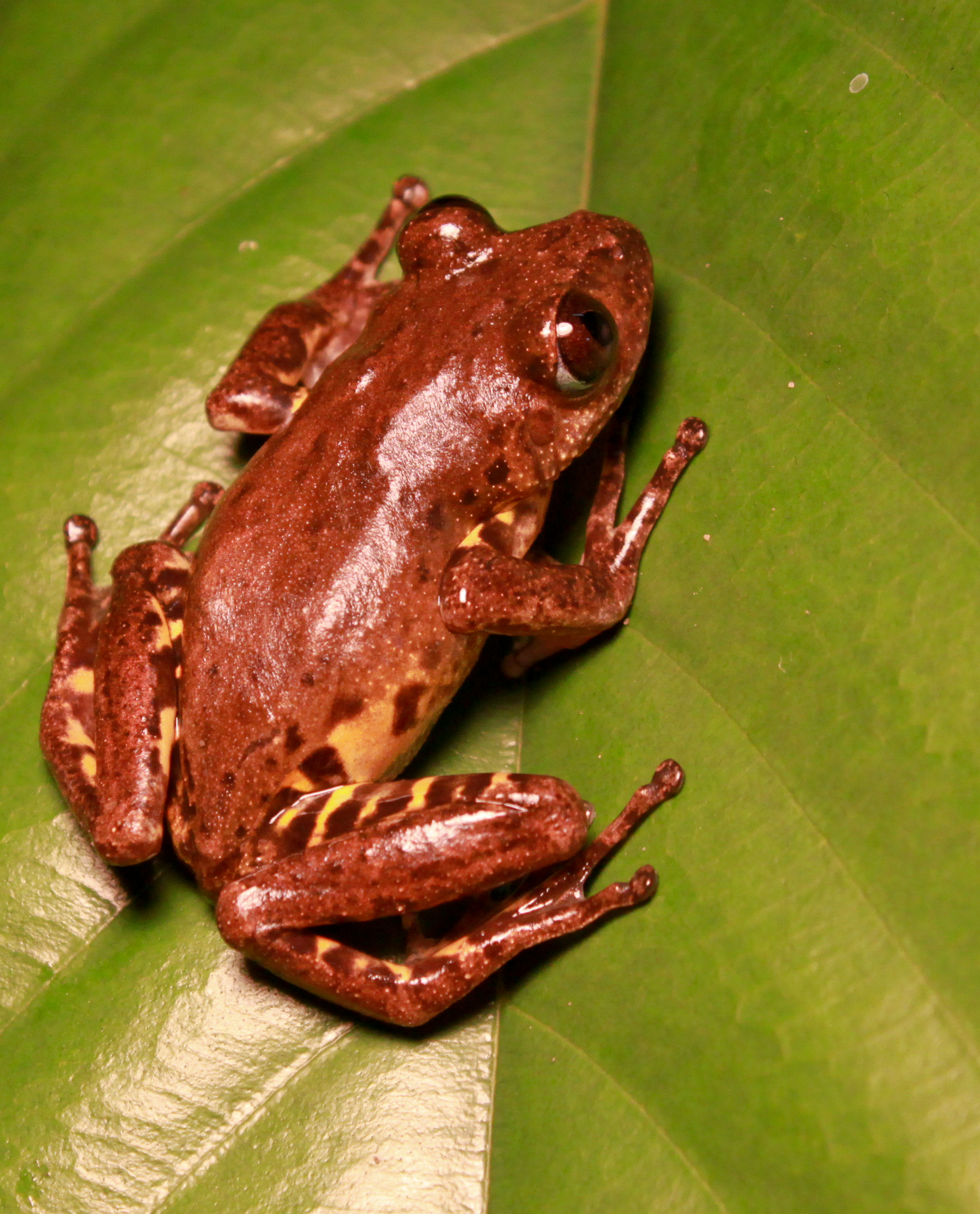
- Phlyctimantis leonardi

Scientific classification
- Kingdom: Animalia
- Phylum: Chordata
- Class: Amphibia
- Order: Anura
- Family: Hyperoliidae
- Genus: Phlyctimantis; Laurent and Combaz, 1950

Type species
- Hylambates leonardi Boulenger, 1906 "1905"

= Phlyctimantis =

Genus of amphibians

Phlyctimantis is a genus of frogs in the family Hyperoliidae. They are found in the Sub-Saharan Africa between Liberia and Tanzania.

== Species ==
It contains the following species:

- Phlyctimantis boulengeri Perret, 1986
- Phlyctimantis keithae Schiøtz, 1975
- Phlyctimantis leonardi (Boulenger, 1906)
- Phlyctimantis maculatus (Duméril, 1853)
- Phlyctimantis verrucosus (Boulenger, 1912)
