= Kassina cassinoides =

Conservation status
- Least Concern (IUCN 3.1)

Scientific classification
- Kingdom: Animalia
- Phylum: Chordata
- Class: Amphibia
- Order: Anura
- Family: Hyperoliidae
- Genus: Kassina
- Species: K. cassinoides

Binomial name
- Kassina cassinoides (Boulenger, 1903)

Synonyms
- Hylambates cassinoides Boulenger, 1903

Species of frog

Kassina cassinoides, also known as large running frog or silver running frog, is a species of frog in the family Hyperoliidae. It is found in Cameroon and—disjunctly—in West Africa, specifically in (from west to east) in Senegal, the Gambia, Mali, Burkina Faso, Ivory Coast, Ghana, Togo, and Benin. It might occur more broadly, and presumably occurs in Guinea, Guinea-Bissau, Niger, Nigeria, and Mauritania.

== Description ==
Kassina cassinoides, measuring 42–46 mm (1.7–1.8 in) in snout–vent length, is a large member of the genus Kassina. The dorsum is silver-gray to yellow and has six longitudinal stripes, of which the two median ones are close together, often coming together. The toes are slightly webbed and have small disks. The fingers have no webbing Kassina cassinoides is not easy to tell apart from Kassina senegalensis.

The male advertisement call is similar to other Kassina, but it differs from the calls of the sympatric K. senegalensis and K. fusca by being deeper (it has the lowest-pitched call of its genus) and more sonorous. The tadpoles are slender and measure 8.5–9.0 mm (0.33–0.35 in) upon hatching and about 55 mm (2.2 in) at the time of metamorphosis.

== Habitat and conservation ==
Kassina cassinoides inhabit dry and wooded savannas and gallery forests. Breeding occurs in the rainy season and takes place in temporary water, preferably in large, well-vegetated pools. Males call from the ground or from elevated sites in the vegetation. The species is nocturnal.

Kassina cassinoides is difficult to find, so it might be more common than it appears to be. It is reasonably common in the Comoé National Park (Ivory Coast). The populations might fluctuate significantly. It is believed to be an adaptable species that is not facing significant threats.
