= Kassina fusca =

Conservation status
- Least Concern (IUCN 3.1)

Scientific classification
- Kingdom: Animalia
- Phylum: Chordata
- Class: Amphibia
- Order: Anura
- Family: Hyperoliidae
- Genus: Kassina
- Species: K. fusca

Binomial name
- Kassina fusca Schiøtz, 1967

Species of frog

Kassina fusca is a species of frog in the family Hyperoliidae. Its common name is brown running frog or pale running frog. It is found in the West African savanna zone in Senegal, Gambia, Guinea, Mali, Burkina Faso, Ivory Coast, Ghana, Togo, Benin, Niger, and Nigeria. It probably occurs in Guinea-Bissau, although there are no records from there.

== Description ==
Kassina fusca is a terrestrial frogs that moves by walking rather than jumping. They are small frogs measuring 29–33 mm (1.1–1.3 in) in snout–vent length. The dorsum is brown with scattered small darker spots (sometimes indistinct) and a larger, irregular, X-shaped spot in the shoulder region. There are small discs on the fingers.

== Association with ants ==
Kassina fusca have been found in nests of pomerine ants Paltothyreus tarsatus and Megaponera analis. These ants are large (up to 18 and 25 mm in body length, respectively) and have powerful mandibles, poison glands, and stings, and would be able to kill the frog. Yet experiments showed that they were never seriously attacked by Paltothyreus tarsatus. This is possible because of chemical components of the frogs' skin, offering the frog a degree of "chemical camouflage". The benefit of this association is that the ant nests provide Kassina fusca hiding places that remain moist during the dry season; such places are in short supply in the savanna and tend to be occupied by ants. Another species showing a similar association is Phrynomantis microps.

== Habitat and conservation ==
Kassina fusca occurs in dry savanna and savanna woodlands. Breeding takes in temporary water, preferably large, well-vegetated, shallow pools. It is very common where it has been found, but the known distribution is patchy; it is often overlooked. It is believed to be an adaptable species that is not facing significant threats. It occurs in some protected areas, including the Comoé National Park.
