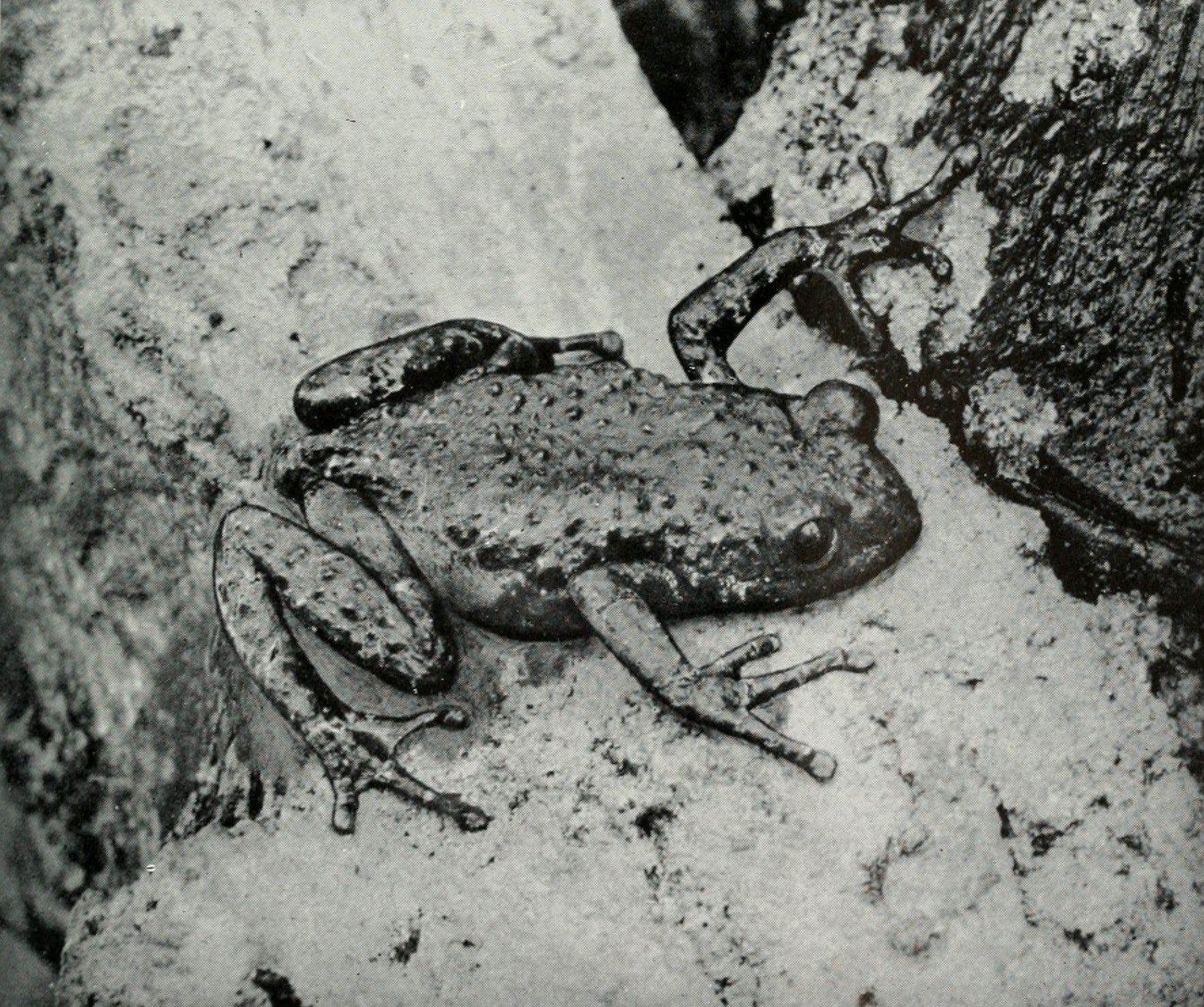

Conservation status
- Least Concern (IUCN 3.1)

Scientific classification
- Kingdom: Animalia
- Phylum: Chordata
- Class: Amphibia
- Order: Anura
- Family: Hyperoliidae
- Genus: Phlyctimantis
- Species: P. verrucosus

Binomial name
- Phlyctimantis verrucosus (Boulenger, 1912)

Synonyms
- Hylambates verrucosus Boulenger, 1912

= Phlyctimantis verrucosus =

Species of frog

Phlyctimantis verrucosus is a species of frog in the family Hyperoliidae. It is found in central and eastern Democratic Republic of the Congo, northern Rwanda, and southern and western Uganda. It might be the same species as Phlyctimantis leonardi found further west, showing clinal variation; in any case, the border between these two species is not well known.

Its natural habitats are lowland and montane forests at elevations of 600–2,000 m (2,000–6,600 ft) above sea level. It is associated with secondary and edge habitats, and occurs in degraded areas, including farm bush. There are no significant threats to this generally common species.
