= Kassina mertensi =

Conservation status
- Least Concern (IUCN 3.1)

Scientific classification
- Kingdom: Animalia
- Phylum: Chordata
- Class: Amphibia
- Order: Anura
- Family: Hyperoliidae
- Genus: Kassina
- Species: K. mertensi

Binomial name
- Kassina mertensi Laurent, 1952

Species of amphibian

Kassina mertensi is a species of frog in the family Hyperoliidae. It is endemic to northeastern Democratic Republic of the Congo. The specific name mertensi honours Robert Mertens, a German zoologist and herpetologist. Common name Mertens' running frog has been coined for it.

Kassina mertensi might be conspecific with Kassina maculosa.

Kassina mertensi occurs clearings in rainforest as well as in heavily degraded former forest (farm bush). Threats to it are not known, but it appears to tolerate some habitat modification.
