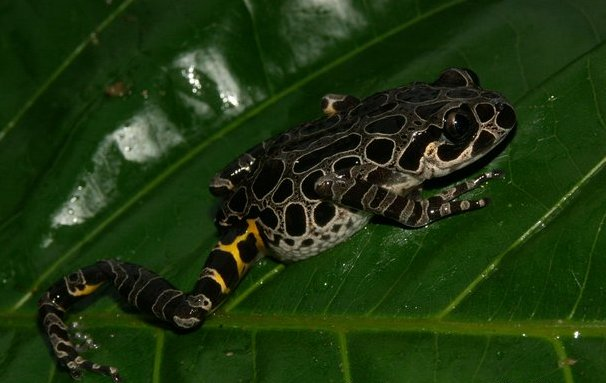

Conservation status
- Vulnerable (IUCN 3.1)

Scientific classification
- Kingdom: Animalia
- Phylum: Chordata
- Class: Amphibia
- Order: Anura
- Family: Hyperoliidae
- Genus: Kassina
- Species: K. decorata

Binomial name
- Kassina decorata (Angel, 1940)

Synonyms
- Megalixalus decorata Angel, 1940

= Decorated running frog =

Species of amphibian

The decorated running frog (Kassina decorata) is a species of frog in the family Hyperoliidae. It is endemic to Cameroon where it is known from the Bamiléké highlands and from Mount Manengouba. There is uncertainty whether it is a valid species, and it has been also considered synonym of Kassina maculosa.

This little known species has been found around lakes and in marshes in high-elevation grassland, and in flooded grassland and marshes in humid savanna.
