= Kassina lamottei =

Conservation status
- Least Concern (IUCN 3.1)

Scientific classification
- Kingdom: Animalia
- Phylum: Chordata
- Class: Amphibia
- Order: Anura
- Family: Hyperoliidae
- Genus: Kassina
- Species: K. lamottei

Binomial name
- Kassina lamottei Schiøtz, 1967

Species of frog

Kassina lamottei is a species of frog in the family Hyperoliidae. It is found in Ivory Coast, possibly Guinea, and possibly Liberia. Its natural habitats are subtropical or tropical moist lowland forests and intermittent freshwater marshes. It is threatened by habitat loss.

These frogs have short hind limbs and tend to crawl sluggishly rather than jump. When threatened the frog bends its back and put its head between its arms which, together with the legs, are held close to the body. The animal thus forms itself into a small, immobile and unrecognisable ball.
