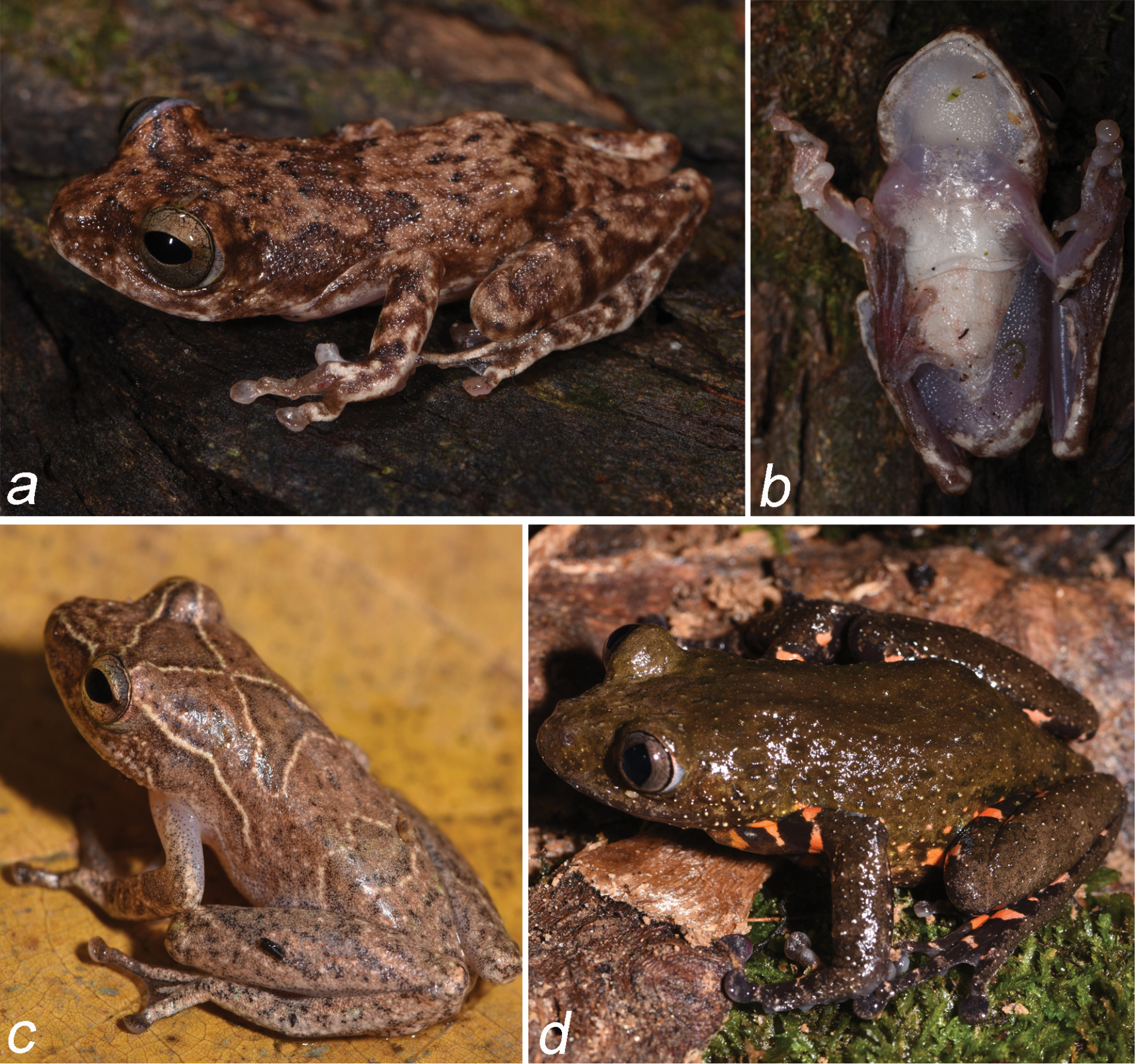
- d male Phlyctimantis boulengeri

Conservation status
- Least Concern (IUCN 3.1)

Scientific classification
- Kingdom: Animalia
- Phylum: Chordata
- Class: Amphibia
- Order: Anura
- Family: Hyperoliidae
- Genus: Phlyctimantis
- Species: P. boulengeri

Binomial name
- Phlyctimantis boulengeri Perret, 1986

= Phlyctimantis boulengeri =

Species of frog

Phlyctimantis boulengeri is a species of frog in the family Hyperoliidae. Its distribution area consists of three disjunct areas: western one in Ivory Coast, southeastern Guinea, Liberia, and southern Ghana, and another one in southeastern Nigeria, western Cameroon, and Gabon, and finally, the Bioko island (Equatorial Guinea). The record from Gabon may refer to Phlyctimantis leonardi, and the western populations might belong to an undescribed species. It occurs in secondary forests, forest clearings, and farm bush. Breeding takes place in larger temporary ponds in forest.

This species can be locally very abundant. It does not face major threats although it probably cannot tolerate complete opening of its habitat.
