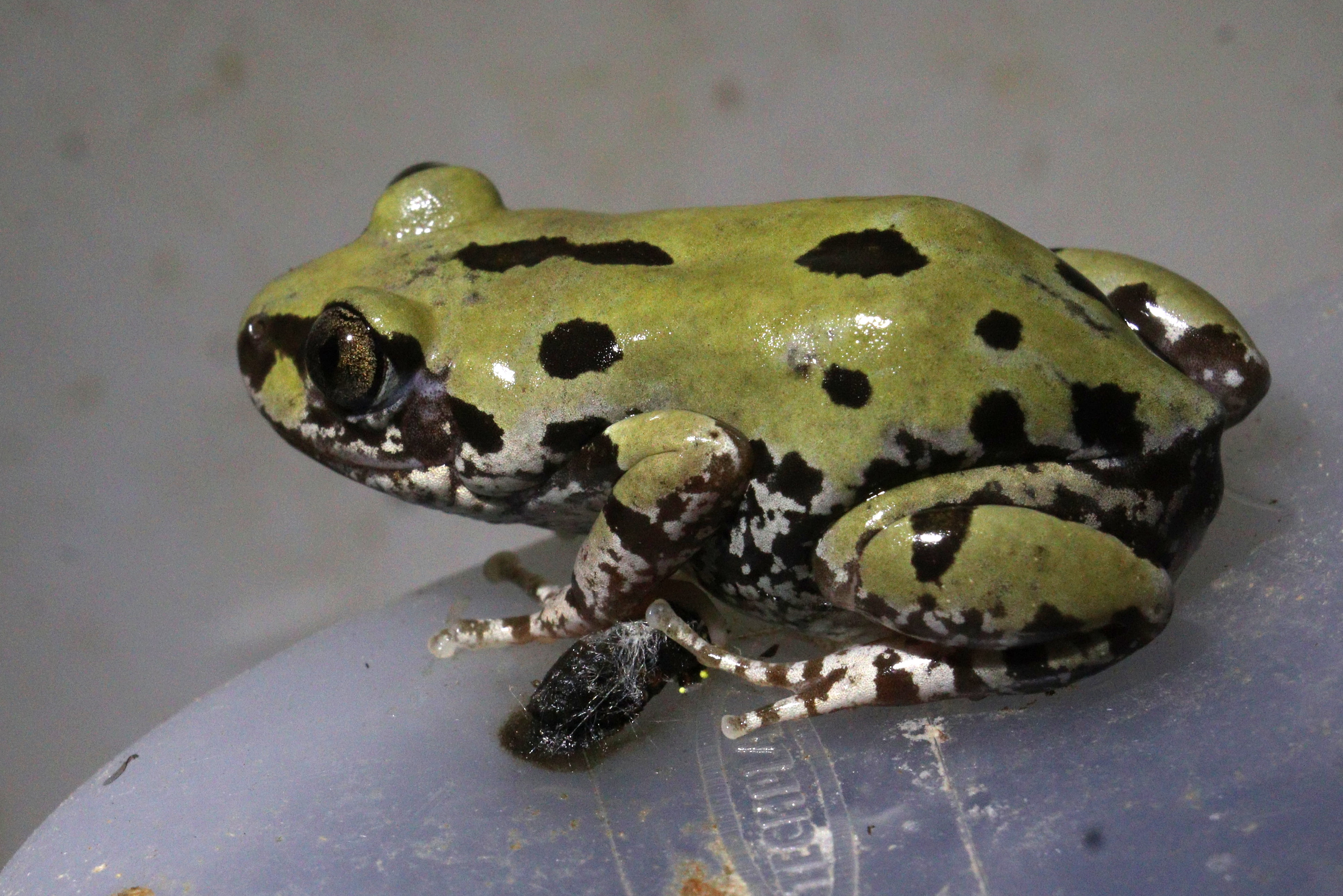

Conservation status
- Least Concern (IUCN 3.1)

Scientific classification
- Kingdom: Animalia
- Phylum: Chordata
- Class: Amphibia
- Order: Anura
- Family: Hyperoliidae
- Genus: Kassina
- Species: K. somalica

Binomial name
- Kassina somalica Scortecci, 1932

Synonyms
- Kassina senegalensis somalica — Schiøtz, 1975

= Kassina somalica =

Species of frog

Kassina somalica, sometimes known as the Somali running frog, is a species of frog in the family Hyperoliidae. It is found in Eritrea, southern and eastern Ethiopia as well as the Rift Valley, Somalia, eastern Kenya, and northern Tanzania. Its natural habitats are arid savannas. It probably breeds in both permanent and temporary bodies of water. It could be threatened by the expanding human population and the associated increases in the populations of domestic livestock. It occurs in a number of protected areas, including the Tsavo East and Tsavo West National Parks.
