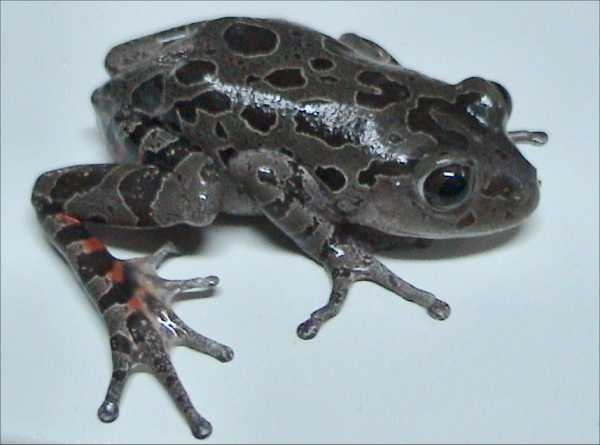
- red-legged running frog Kassina maculata

Scientific classification
- Kingdom: Animalia
- Phylum: Chordata
- Class: Amphibia
- Order: Anura
- Family: Hyperoliidae
- Genus: Kassina; Girard, 1853

Synonyms
- Eremiophilus Fitzinger, 1843 (suppressed name); Hylambates Duméril, 1853; Cassiniopsis Monard, 1937 "1936"

= Kassina =

Genus of amphibians

Kassina is a genus of hyperoliid frogs, commonly referred to as running frogs or kassinas. They are found throughout sub-Saharan Africa. They are characterized by preferring a distinctive "walking" with the back legs instead of the more traditional frog-hopping.

== Species ==
The following species are recognized in the genus Kassina:

- Kassina arboricola Perret, 1985 — Ivory Coast running frog
- Kassina cassinoides (Boulenger, 1903) — silver running frog
- Kassina cochranae (Loveridge, 1941) — Cochran's running frog
- Kassina decorata (Angel, 1940) - Decorated running frog
- Kassina fusca Schiøtz, 1967 — brown running frog
- Kassina jozani Msuya, Howell, and Channing, 2007
- Kassina kuvangensis (Monard, 1937) — Kuvangu running frog
- Kassina lamottei Schiøtz, 1967 — rainforest running frog
- Kassina maculifer (Ahl, 1924) — Parker's running frog
- Kassina maculosa (Sternfeld, 1917) — marbled running frog
- Kassina mertensi Laurent, 1952 — Mertens' running frog
- Kassina schioetzi Rödel, Grafe, Rudolf, and Ernst, 2002 — Schiøtz's running frog
- Kassina senegalensis (Duméril and Bibron, 1841) — Senegal running frog
- Kassina somalica Scortecci, 1932 — Somalian running frog
- Kassina wazae Amiet, 2007

== In captivity ==
K. maculata is frequently exported from Tanzania for the exotic pet trade. They require more horizontal space than vertical, being a terrestrial species. Their captive environment should include a substrate that accommodates burrowing, and provides high humidity. K. maculata will readily eat crickets and small mealworms, although insects should be dusted with a vitamin supplement.

Other species of running frogs are occasionally imported, with the K. senegalensis being the next most common species in captivity.

== Research ==
It is the source of "kassinin", a frequently studied tachykinin peptide.
