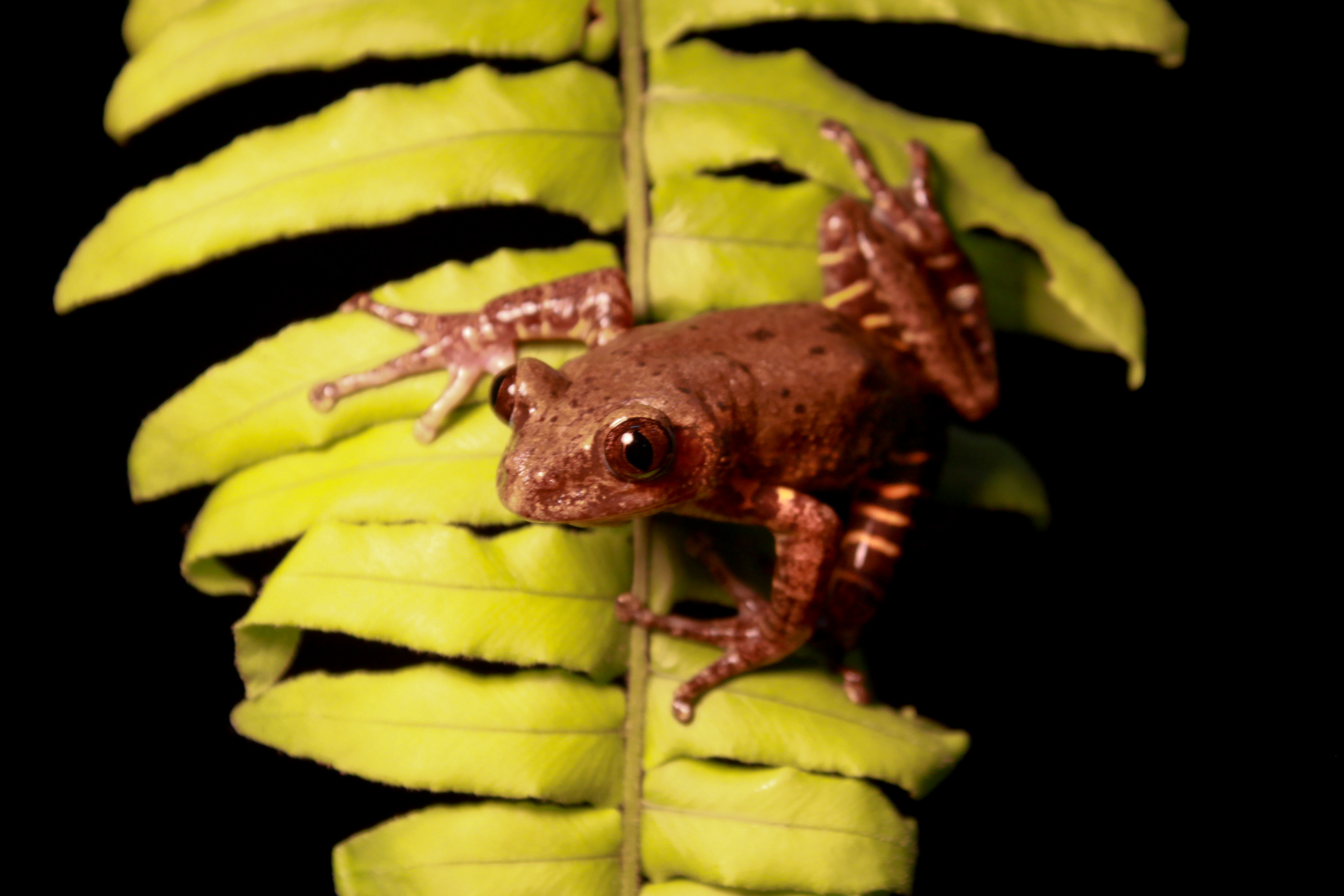
- H. leonardi

Scientific classification
- Kingdom: Animalia
- Phylum: Chordata
- Class: Amphibia
- Order: Anura
- Family: Hyperoliidae
- Genus: Hylambates; Duméril, 1853

Type species
- Hylambates maculatus Bianconi, 1849 "1848"

Species
- 5 (see text)

Synonyms
- Phlyctimantis Laurent and Combaz, 1950

= Hylambates =

Genus of amphibians

Hylambates, commonly known as the African striped frogs or wot-wots, is a genus of frog in the family Hyperoliidae, occurring across much of sub-Saharan Africa.

== Species ==
The following species are recognised in the genus Hylambates as of July 2026:

- Hylambates boulengeri (Perret, 1986)
- Hylambates keithae (Schiøtz, 1975)
- Hylambates leonardi Boulenger, 1906
- Hylambates maculatus Duméril, 1853
- Hylambates verrucosus Boulenger, 1912
