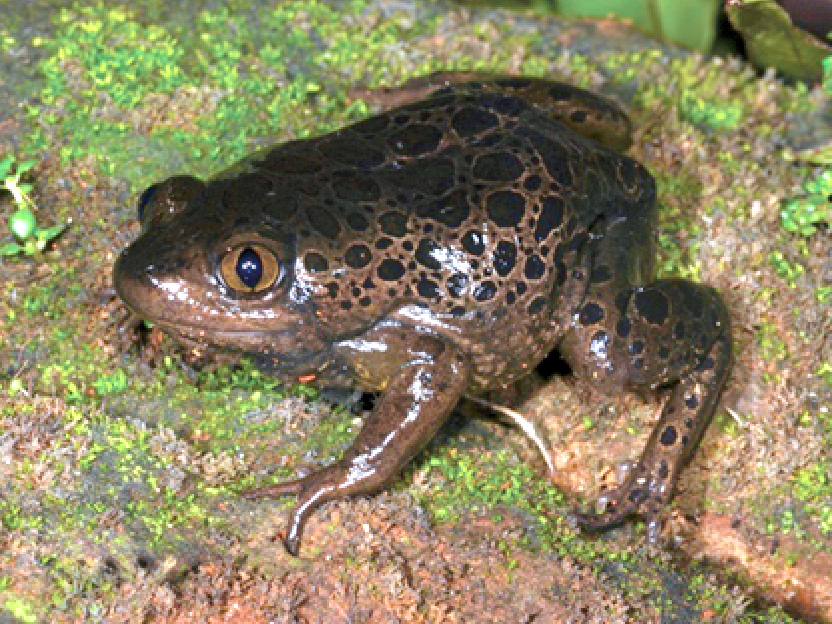

Conservation status
- Least Concern (IUCN 3.1)

Scientific classification
- Kingdom: Animalia
- Phylum: Chordata
- Class: Amphibia
- Order: Anura
- Family: Hyperoliidae
- Genus: Kassina
- Species: K. kuvangensis

Binomial name
- Kassina kuvangensis (Monard, 1937)

Synonyms
- Cassiniopsis kuvangensis Monard, 1937 "1936"; Kassina ingeri Laurent, 1963

= Kassina kuvangensis =

Species of frog

Kassina kuvangensis is a species of frog in the family Hyperoliidae. It is found in south-central Angola and northern and western Zambia. Its range probably extends into the southern Democratic Republic of the Congo. It is also known as the Kuvangu running frog, Kuvango running frog, and Kuvangu kassina.

== Description ==
Adult males measure 41–51 mm (1.6–2.0 in) in snout–vent length. The dorsum is dark with indistinct darker spots, or uniformly dark. The ventrum is light, sometimes having indications of dark reticulation. The concealed parts of legs are marbled in red and grey. The gular disc is round rather than strap-like. The finger and the toe tips are not dilated.

The males call in very large numbers from flooded grasslands. The call is a very fast, somewhat irregular series of relatively unmelodic "quoicks". Females lay up to 130 eggs in a sticky clump. The tadpoles are bright yellow with darker mottling. They are large, measuring up to 102 mm (4.0 in) in length, including a very high fin.

== Habitat and conservation ==
Kassina kuvangensis is associated with dense swamps and flooded grasslands in wooded savanna. Breeding takes place in flooded grasslands, marshes, and slow-flowing streams in dense vegetation. It is a common species that is unlikely to face significant threats. It is likely to occur in several protected areas.
