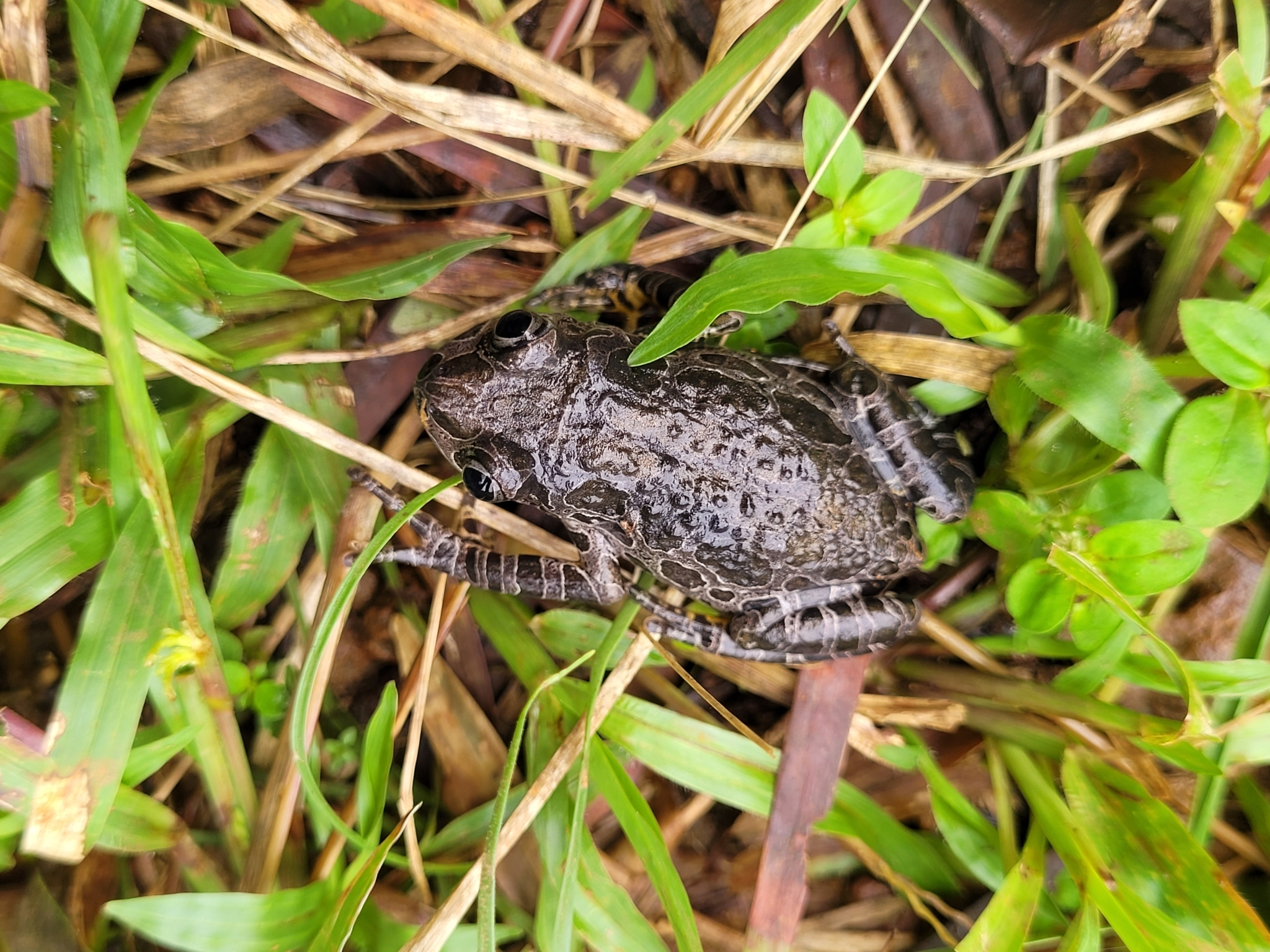

Conservation status
- Vulnerable (IUCN 3.1)

Scientific classification
- Kingdom: Animalia
- Phylum: Chordata
- Class: Amphibia
- Order: Anura
- Family: Hyperoliidae
- Genus: Kassina
- Species: K. arboricola

Binomial name
- Kassina arboricola Perret, 1985

Synonyms
- Kassina cochranae arboricola — Schiøtz, 1999

= Kassina arboricola =

Species of frog

Kassina arboricola, sometimes known as the Ivory Coast running frog, is a species of frog in the family Hyperoliidae. It is found in southwestern Ghana and westward to south-central Ivory Coast. It occurs in secondary forests and forest edges, and to very limited extent, degraded former forest (farm bush). Breeding takes place in both temporary and permanent bodies of water, although it favours large, well-vegetated pools. It is probably negatively impacted by severe deforestation caused by agricultural expansion, logging, and growing human settlements.
