= Kassina schioetzi =

Conservation status
- Least Concern (IUCN 3.1)

Scientific classification
- Kingdom: Animalia
- Phylum: Chordata
- Class: Amphibia
- Order: Anura
- Family: Hyperoliidae
- Genus: Kassina
- Species: K. schioetzi

Binomial name
- Kassina schioetzi Rödel, Grafe, Rudolf, and Ernst, 2002

Species of amphibian

Kassina schioetzi is a species of frogs in the family Hyperoliidae. It is found in Ivory Coast and extreme southeastern Guinea. Its range probably extends into northwestern Ghana.

== Etymology ==
The specific name schioetzi honours Schiøtz, a Danish herpetologist.

== Description ==
Males measure 35–39 mm (1.4–1.5 in) and females 37–40 mm (1.5–1.6 in) in snout–vent length. The dorsum is olive green to beige with dark brown spots that have fine light yellow borders; there are 31–50 large spots arranged in 5–7 longitudinal rows on the back and flanks. Males have slightly more spots than females. The groin area is yellowish orange to reddish. The posterior border of the eye is bluish and the iris is golden. The throat is blackish. The venter is white.

The male advertisement call is short and tonal, with an upward frequency sweep characteristic of its genus.

== Habitat and conservation ==
The species is found primarily in wooded Guinea savanna and in gallery forests, and to a lesser extent, in open savanna. Breeding takes place in both temporary and permanent water, preferably in large, well-vegetated pools. Males may call from the ground and elevated perches some 1–6 m above ground, often some distance (up to 50 m) away from the pool.

Kassina schioetzi is an adaptable species that tolerates habitat modification, as long as good vegetation cover remains. It is not facing serious threats, although very severe opening up of its habitat for agriculture could be a threat. It is found in several protected areas, including the Comoé National Park, Marahoué National Park, Mont Péko National Park, all in Ivory Coast, and the Mount Nimba World Heritage Site in Guinea and Ivory Coast.
