= Hylambates keithae =

Conservation status
- Endangered (IUCN 3.1)

Scientific classification
- Kingdom: Animalia
- Phylum: Chordata
- Class: Amphibia
- Order: Anura
- Family: Hyperoliidae
- Genus: Hylambates
- Species: H. keithae

Binomial name
- Hylambates keithae (Schiøtz, 1975)

Synonyms
- Phlyctimantis keithae Schiøtz, 1975; Kassina keithae Dubois, 1987

Species of frog

Hylambates keithae (common names: Keith's striped frog, Keith's wot-wot, wot-wot) is a species of frog in the family Hyperoliidae. It is endemic to the Udzungwa Mountains, Tanzania. The specific name keithae honors Rolanda Keith, an American herpetologist.

== Description ==
Hylambates keithae are medium-sized tree frogs: adult males measure 39–43 mm (1.5–1.7 in) in snout–vent length. Discs are small and toe webbing is reduced. The dorsum is blackish with olive tinge. There are minute white spots on tiny warts. The ventrum is mottled with black and light bluish. The concealed parts of limbs are striped or mottled with black and orange-red. The iris is dark olive brown.

Hylambates keithae can assume a defensive posture where the frog rapidly twists onto its back and throws its limbs across the body. This makes it look very little frog-like, and probably serves as camouflage, perhaps conflicting with the potential predator's search image.

== Habitat and conservation ==
Hylambates keithae occurs in forests, montane grasslands, and open farmland near forests at elevations of 1,800–2,000 m (5,900–6,600 ft) above sea level. Breeding takes place in shallow pools (including artificial ponds) with emergent vegetation. It is probably a forest species moving to open areas for breeding. Males call concealed in grass-tufts near the water's edge.

This rarely encountered species has a restricted range and is threatened by habitat loss and change (afforestation with alien species, agricultural expansion, fires used to maintain pastureland, and human settlement). It is not known to occur in any protected areas.
