= Kassina jozani =

Conservation status
- Endangered (IUCN 3.1)

Scientific classification
- Kingdom: Animalia
- Phylum: Chordata
- Class: Amphibia
- Order: Anura
- Family: Hyperoliidae
- Genus: Kassina
- Species: K. jozani

Binomial name
- Kassina jozani Msuya, Howell, and Channing, 2007
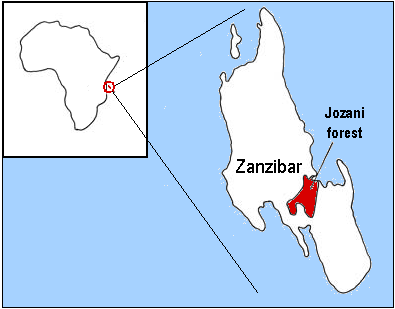

Species of amphibian

Kassina jozani is a species of frogs in the family Hyperoliidae. It is endemic to Tanzania and only known from the Jozani Forest on the Unguja Island (Zanzibar).

== Description ==
It is a medium-sized frog (males measure about 4 cm). The back is covered with splashes of color from black to dark gray, separated by light gray, thin lines with a light creamy white belly. Its eyes are large and protruding, and the ends of its fingers and extremely flattened.

== Habitat ==
Its natural habitat is forest and small-holder farmland surrounding pools at elevations of 50 m (160 ft) above sea level.
