= Kassina cochranae =

Conservation status
- Least Concern (IUCN 3.1)

Scientific classification
- Kingdom: Animalia
- Phylum: Chordata
- Class: Amphibia
- Order: Anura
- Family: Hyperoliidae
- Genus: Kassina
- Species: K. cochranae

Binomial name
- Kassina cochranae (Loveridge, 1941)

Synonyms
- Kassina maculata Parker, 1931 (secondary homonym of Hylambates maculatus Duméril, 1853); Hylambates cochranae Loveridge, 1941

Species of frog

Kassina cochranae, sometimes known as the Cochran's running frog, is a species of frog in the family Hyperoliidae. It is found in southern Guinea, Liberia, Sierra Leone, western Ivory Coast (the Mount Nimba area, possibly wider), and at least tentatively, southern Ghana. Kassina arboricola was for a period treated as a subspecies Kassina cochranae arboricola, but it is now considered a valid species.

== Etymology ==
The specific name cochranae honours Doris Mable Cochran, an American herpetologist.

== Description ==
Kassina cochranae are medium-sized, sturdy frogs. The legs and arms are short. There are 35–77 large spots on flanks and dorsum. The belly is white to brown and sometimes has scattered, small punctuations (but never with large spots). There are zero to two occipital spots. Males typically have dark throat that sometimes has black spots.

== Habitat and conservation ==
Kassina cochranae is an arboreal, forest-dwelling species, including secondary forests. There are also records from moist and montane savanna as well as montane grassland. It seems to be able persist in habitat fragments and gallery forests. Reproduction is presumed to take place in temporary and permanent bodies of water, preferably large, well-vegetated pools, as with other Kassina species. The males call from branches of bushes and trees 2–4 metres above the ground. Although typically a forest species, they often call on more exposed sites at the edges of ponds or beside roads.

Kassina cochranae is locally abundant. It is locally threatened by habitat loss (severe deforestation).
