= Kassina maculifer =

Conservation status
- Least Concern (IUCN 3.1)

Scientific classification
- Kingdom: Animalia
- Phylum: Chordata
- Class: Amphibia
- Order: Anura
- Family: Hyperoliidae
- Genus: Kassina
- Species: K. maculifer

Binomial name
- Kassina maculifer (Ahl, 1924)

Synonyms
- Kassina parkeri Scortecci, 1932

Species of frog

Kassina maculifer is a species of frog in the family Hyperoliidae. It is found in Ethiopia, Kenya, and Somalia. Its natural habitats are dry savanna, subtropical or tropical dry shrubland, freshwater marshes, and intermittent freshwater marshes. It is threatened by habitat loss.
