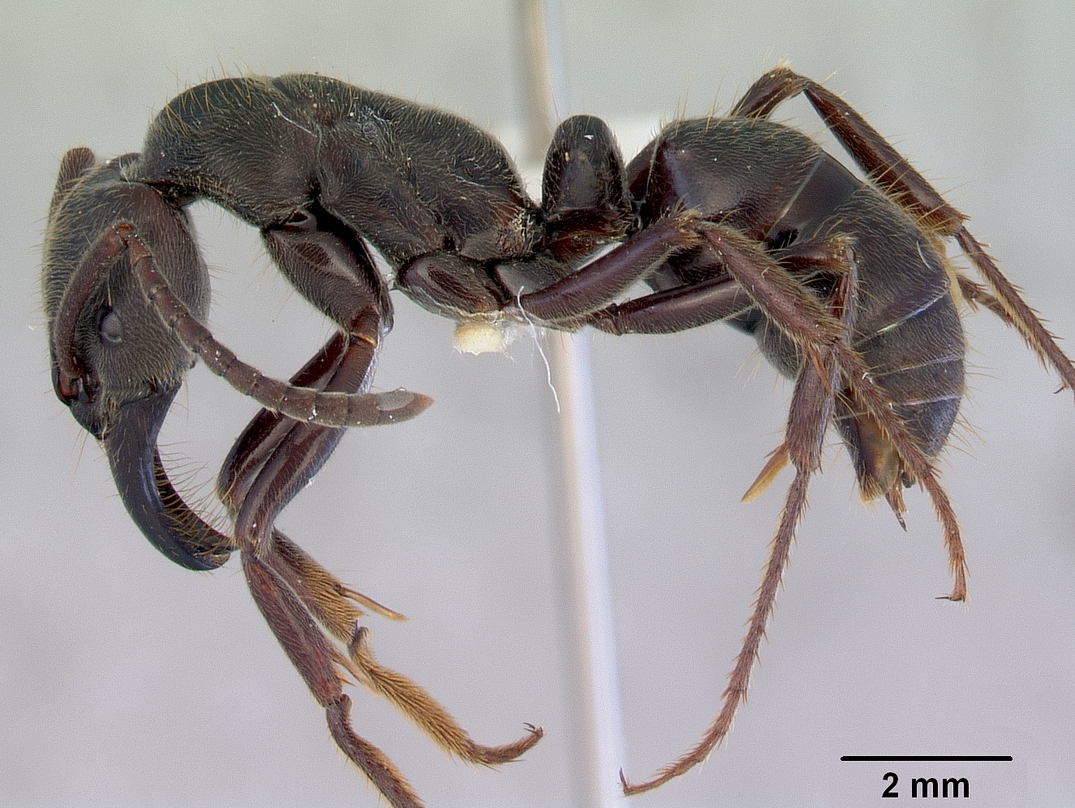
- Paltothyreus tarsatus worker

Scientific classification
- Kingdom: Animalia
- Phylum: Arthropoda
- Class: Insecta
- Order: Hymenoptera
- Family: Formicidae
- Subfamily: Ponerinae
- Tribe: Ponerini
- Genus: Paltothyreus; Mayr, 1862
- Species: P. tarsatus

Binomial name
- Paltothyreus tarsatus (Fabricius, 1798)

Synonyms
- Formica tarsata Fabricius, 1798 (type species of Paltothyreus)

= Paltothyreus =

Genus of ants

Paltothyreus (also known as African stink ant) is a monotypic genus of ants in the subfamily Ponerinae. Paltothyreus tarsatus, the single described species, is widely distributed in Sub-Saharan Africa. Workers are very large in size (17–20 mm); queens are similar to workers, but larger (23 mm) and winged.

== Habitat ==
Paltothyreus tarsatus construct shallow nests that cover a large home range. Most of the nest is shallow tunnels used by foragers to travel without risking predation and emerging far from the nest center. The nests can have as many as 5000 workers, a number very few ant species are able to match. Although the ants are predators and feed on animals as large as beetles, the frog Phrynomantis microps is sometimes found inside the nests as it uses them as a burrow. A skin secretion that inhibits the ant's aggression allows it to coexist with the ants.

== See also ==
- Buniapone, sister genus of Paltothyreus
