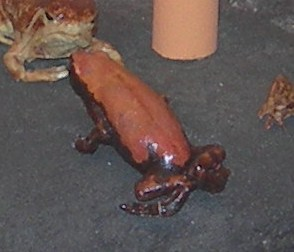

Conservation status
- Least Concern (IUCN 3.1)

Scientific classification
- Kingdom: Animalia
- Phylum: Chordata
- Class: Amphibia
- Order: Anura
- Family: Microhylidae
- Genus: Phrynomantis
- Species: P. microps

Binomial name
- Phrynomantis microps Peters, 1875

= Phrynomantis microps =

Species of amphibian

Phrynomantis microps is an African frog with many interesting adaptations to the savannah. These frogs are also called the Accra snake-necked frog. They are found across Western and Central Africa. One of its distinguishing features is the peptide secretion on its skin, which goes beyond toxicity and seems to inhibit aggressive behavior like biting and stinging from large ants. This allows Phrynomantis microps to live in humid burrows within large ant nests and termite mounds, where they are frequently found. While Phrynomantis microps feeds on similar insects such as the termite Macrotermes bellicosus, they have never been found to feed on the ants they share the nest with. These frogs are medium-sized and have a bright red pelvic region.

== Description ==
Phrynomantis microps are a medium-sized frog that measures between 40 and 60mm as an adult. Their back as well as the pelvic region are bright red while the rest of the body is dark brown. The brightness of the red back can change to brown or even gray depending on the situation in which the frog finds itself, the pelvic region will always be the reddest part of the body.

== Habitat and distribution ==
Its natural habitats are dry savanna, moist savanna, subtropical or tropical dry shrubland, subtropical or tropical moist shrubland, subtropical or tropical dry lowland grassland, subtropical or tropical seasonally wet or flooded lowland grassland, intermittent freshwater lakes, intermittent freshwater marshes, arable land, and pastureland.

Adult Phrynomantis microps live alone in burrows under the many different savannah types. Ponds formed during the rainy season are the site of mating and where the offspring Phrynomantis microps live until they are no longer tadpoles. The adult Phrynomantis microps are usually deep underground in order to be in a humid environment. Frequently these burrows are merged seamlessly with the nests of large ants, to the point where it is not clear whether the burrows were dug by the frog or are originally tunnels by the ants. There are also cases where a Phrynomantis microps have been found in scorpion burrows. Since not all tunnels in the ant burrow are large enough for Phrynomantis microps to fit, it is likely it digs its own burrow.

Phrynomantis microps are found all across Western and Central Africa, from Senegal to the Central African Republic and parts of South Sudan. Several studies of Phrynomantis microps are undertaken at Comoé National Park (CNP) in the Ivory Coast.

== Conservation ==
Phrynomantis microps is not an endangered species, and is categorized as Least Concern.

Phrynomantis microps tadpoles, among other species, were found to be important regulators of algal biomass in freshwater ponds. The algae begins as microalgae – phytoplankton and periphyton – which the Phrynomantis microps tadpoles feed on. Increased predation (in the case of an experimental study, by carnivorous tadpoles) led to an increase in algal biomass which proved detrimental for the pond ecosystem.

== Home range and territoriality ==
Phrynomantis microps exhibit no evidence of territoriality. They do not seem to guard their territory during the day or at night when hunting, and as many as six Phrynomantis microps can be found inhabiting the same ant nest. When calling, males migrate in search of a nearby pond formed by the heavy rains and do not claim a territory. After mating, the eggs are laid in the pond and other couples may also lay their eggs in the same pond.

== Diet ==
=== Juvenile ===
Tadpole Phrynomantis microps are suspension feeders, eating planktonic organisms in the water.

=== Adult ===
Adult Phrynomantis microps are insectivores that feed exclusively on ants and termites. Interestingly, they do not seem to feed on the ants in which they share their burrows, instead leaving at night to hunt.

== Reproduction and mating ==
Spawning of Phrynomantis microps is fairly typical, with the male forming an amplexus and fertilizing the female. They then remain coupled while they finish walking to a nearby pond, where immediately after fertilization the egg clutches are laid. The number of eggs laid varies considerably, with the number from observed spawnings ranging from 100 to 600+ eggs. The eggs are white or yellowish. Tadpoles hatch after two days, and are translucent. The tadpoles metamorphose into froglets in 40 days and then leave the water.

Phrynomantis microps will only search for mates during the rainy season of their respective habitats, which vary in duration and precipitation rates. It will lay multiple clutches that are split into multiple clutches of eggs of varying sizes. Locations are both within and between separate ponds formed by the rain. For example, in the CNP, reproductive activity was measured from 1992 to 1996. While from 1992 to 1994 reproductive activity – male calling, clutches – was only observed after rainfalls of more than 16mm, from 1995 to 1996 the same was found after rainfall of only 2mm. Over the course of the same years, Phrynomantis microps in another reserve in Benin would exhibit reproductive activity at different rainfall rates. However, more rain always leads to increased spawning.

After a day of sufficient heavy rainfall, males emerge from their burrows at night to call while they migrate towards ponds. They will call at most for 1–3 nights. A female arrives and spawning lasts 20–34 minutes. One to nine spawning bouts produce a clutch, which the couples spread by swimming around the pond where they mated. In order to lessen the risk of losing the entire clutch to predation, it is spread into multiple clutches. This is done within one pond or even between ponds. The clutch size therefore varies considerably, ranging from 30 to 1400 eggs – sometimes representing the reproductive investment of two females. Tadpoles that hatch are translucent to camouflage from predators, but will also swarm in the presence of a possible predator. Swarms can reach up to 4000 individuals. Despite this, the survival rate of clutch to adult is only about 0.1%. This is also due to ponds drying up, killing any remaining tadpoles. While other frog species predict the viability of ponds before laying their eggs, it appears Phrynomantis microps does not. Phrynomantis microps also live much farther away from ponds than other frog species, which could make visiting ponds to check their viability more costly.

== Parental care ==
Although it appears Phrynomantis microps are careful when laying their clutches, they return to their burrows after spawning and offer no parental care. Smaller clutches are left closer to the surface and usually attached to vegetation, while larger clutches are laid deeper and where there is no vegetation.

== Social behavior ==
As mentioned before, adult Phrynomantis microps are solitary. However, when they are tadpoles Phrynomantis microps exhibit swarming behavior if a predation threat emerges. Tadpole predators usually rely on their vision to discern prey, such as the dragonfly larvae of Anax imperator. Swarming could be confusing the predator, making it harder to discern prey from one another, as well as increasing the chances of survival for tadpoles within the group.

Swarms can reach up to 4000 individuals and can last either seconds or a few minutes. When swarming, tadpoles of all stages join but form subgroups based on size. Kinship does not seem to play a role in the swarming behavior.

== Enemies ==
Tadpoles are very susceptible to predation, which leads to their swarming behavior. In addition to Anax imperator mentioned before, tadpoles are also hunted by the larvae of aquatic arthropods Tramea basilaris and Pantala flavescens. Adult aquatic predators include two water beetle species (Hydrocyrius columbiae and Nepella pauliani) and Ranatra sp. Hatchlings of the turtle Pelomedusa subrufa also feed on the tadpoles of P. microps , among other frog species.

Once an adult, Phrynomantis microps has a unique way of avoiding predation during daylight. Many Phrynomantis microps take up residence in nests of large ants or termites. These large ants, including the species Paltothyreus tarsatus and Megaponera foetens, are extremely aggressive and capable of both biting and stinging. Their stings are enough to greatly injure or kill frogs. Despite the ants' territoriality, Phrynomantis microps are able to live within the burrows and never suffer a single sting and only the occasional bite. That is thanks to the peptide secretion they produce on their skin.

When entering a burrow or triggering aggression from the ants, Phrynomantis microps crouch their bodies and cover their heads with their forelegs, raising their posterior upwards. This posture is a common defense against predation in other frog species, and uses the markings on the frogs posterior to mimic the head of a larger animal. Thus it is likely not a specific adaptation towards the ants. Remaining still does allow the ants to antennate and explore the frog's body. The ants quickly rub their antennae against their forelegs, indicating the secretion is likely toxic to the ants. Termites bathed in water that Phrynomantis microps had bathed in shortly before also inhibited any aggressive behavior from the ants, despite being their favorite prey.

== Protective coloration and behavior ==
Tadpoles are translucent and remain near the surface of the water during the day. They move very little or not at all, only using their fin filaments to remain head facing slightly up towards the surface. It is postured that their translucent bodies, when close to the surface, use the entering light to camouflage from predators. When it is dark any light will make them shine rather than melt into the surrounding water, which would explain why the tadpoles move into deeper water when night arrives, and never swarm at night.

== Gallery ==
Adult Phrynomantis microps moving unharmed between African Stink Ants (Paltothyreus tarsatus).

Phrynomantis microps metamorph moving unharmed between African Stink Ants.

== Sources ==
- C. Michael Hogan. 2013. Phrynomantis microps. African Amphibians Lifedesk. ed. B.Zimkus
- AmphibiaWeb. 2022. https://amphibiaweb.org University of California, Berkeley, CA, USA. Accessed 12 Oct 2022
- Carroll, John & Weldon, Paul. (2006). Vertebrate Chemical Defense. 10.1201/9781420006650.ch3.
- Hirschfeld, Mareike, and Mark-Oliver Rödel. "Variable Reproductive Strategies of an African Savanna Frog, 'Phrynomantis Microps' (Amphibia, Anura, Microhylidae)." Journal of Tropical Ecology, vol. 27, no. 6, 2011, pp. 601–09. JSTOR, JSTOR 23012407. Accessed 13 Oct. 2022.
- Marko Spieler, Risk of predation affects aggregation size: a study with tadpoles of Phrynomantis microps (Anura: Microhylidae), Animal Behaviour, Volume 65, Issue 1, 2003, Pages 179–184, ISSN 0003-3472, https://doi.org/10.1006/anbe.2002.2030.
- Rodel, M.-O., & Braun, U. (1999). Associations between Anurans and Ants in a West African Savanna (Anura: Microhylidae, Hyperoliidae, and Hymenoptera: Formicidae). Biotropica, 31, 178. https://doi.org/10.2307/2663971
- Rodel M-O, Brede C, Hirschfeld M, Schmitt T, Favreau P, et al. (2013) Chemical Camouflage – A Frog's Strategy to Co-Exist with Aggressive Ants. PLoS ONE 8(12): e81950. doi:10.1371/journal.pone.0081950
- Rodel, M.-O. & Linsenmairk,. E. 1997: Predator-induced swarms in the tadpoles of an African savanna frog, Phrynomantis microps. Ethology 103, 902–91 4.
- Zongo, Bilassé & Boussim, Issaka. (2015). The effects of physiochemical variables and tadpole assemblages on microalgal communities in freshwater temporary ponds through an experimental approach. Aquatic biosystems. 11. 1. 10.1186/s12999-014-0013-4.
