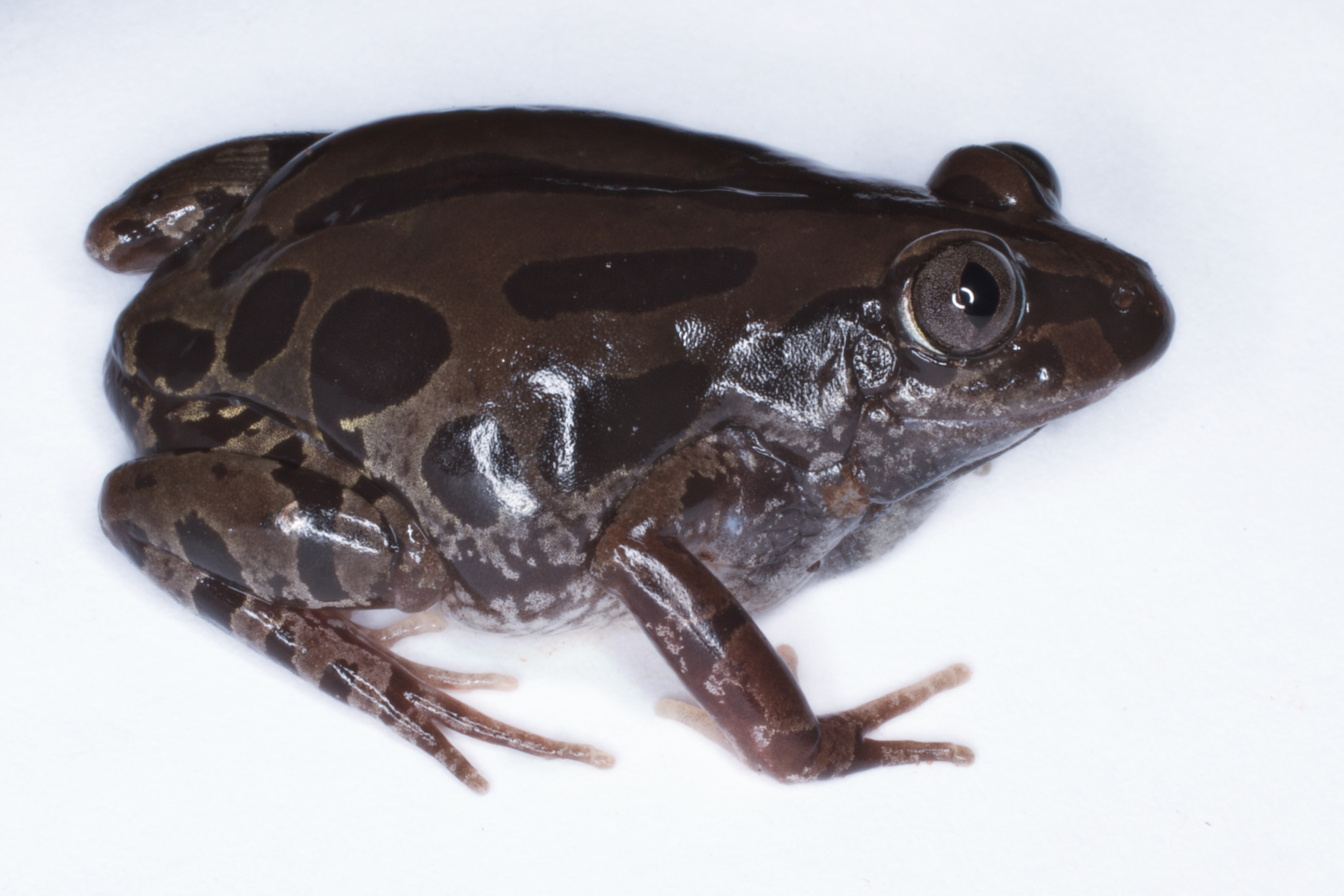

Conservation status
- Least Concern (IUCN 3.1)

Scientific classification
- Kingdom: Animalia
- Phylum: Chordata
- Class: Amphibia
- Order: Anura
- Family: Hyperoliidae
- Genus: Kassina
- Species: K. senegalensis

Binomial name
- Kassina senegalensis (Dumeril & Bibron, 1841)
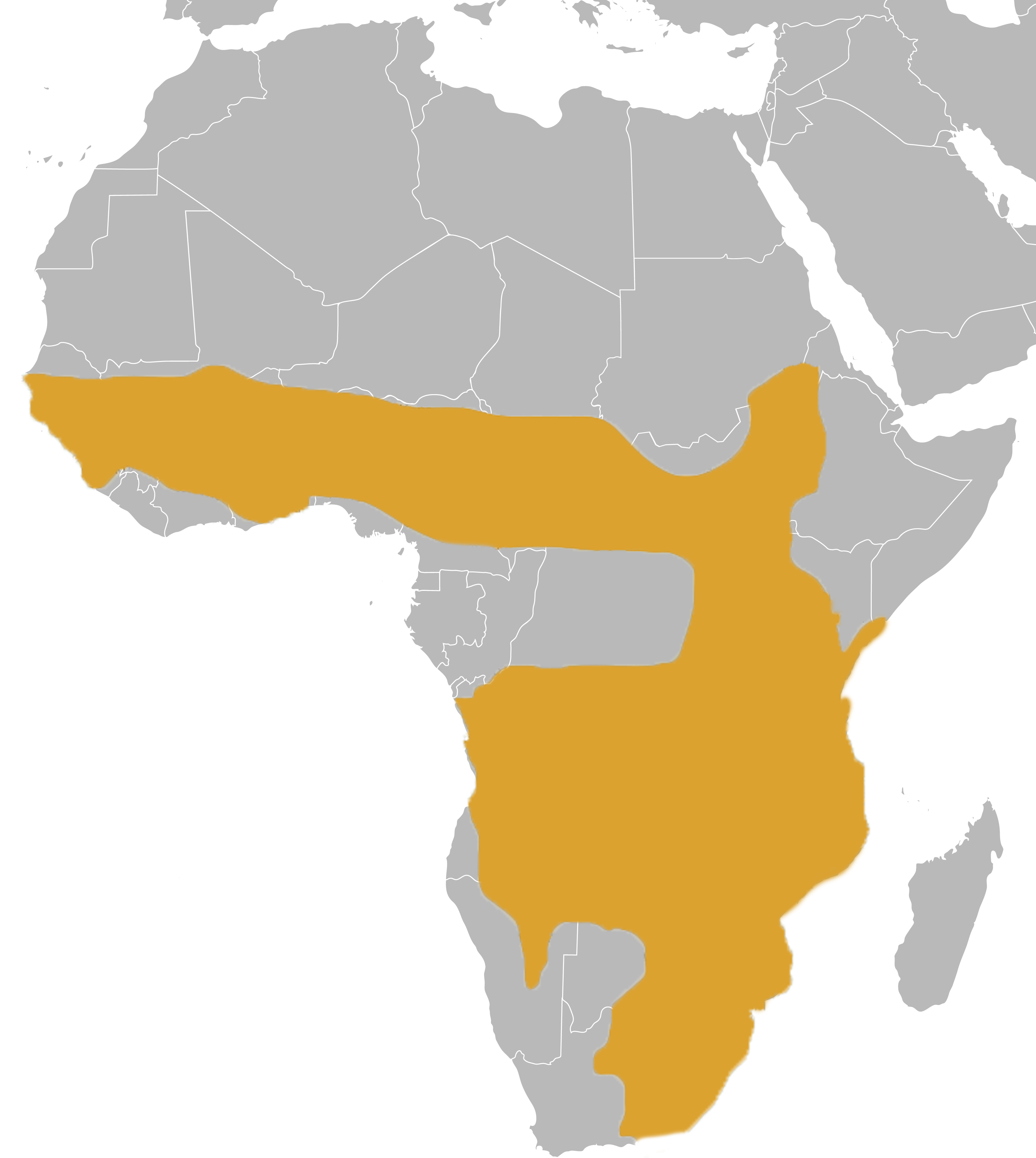
- Range map of K. senegalensis

Synonyms
- List: Cystignathus senegalensis Duméril and Bibron, 1841; Cystignathus argyreivittis Peters, 1854; Cassina senegalensis (Duméril and Bibron, 1841); Cassina argyreivittis (Peters, 1854); Kassina deserticola Ahl, 1930; Kassina modesta Ahl, 1930; Cassina angeli De Witte, 1933; Kassina benueana Monard, 1951; Kassina argyreivittis (Peters, 1854); Hylambates senegalensis (Duméril and Bibron, 1841)

= Kassina senegalensis =

Species of frog

Kassina senegalensis, also known as the Senegal running frog, along with many other common names, (Note: Other common names used for Kassina senegalensis in modern publications include Senegal kassina, Senegal Kassin's frog, running frog, bubbling kassina, and burbling kassina.) is a species of frog native to much of Africa. It is a small and solidly-built species with large eyes. Most of the body is greyish-black, but there are brown bands and spots on certain parts. They can be found in many types of habitats, such as shrublands, grasslands, and wetlands, at elevations as high as 2,000 metres (1.2 mi). Their breeding occurs in water, where eggs are laid in various locations and fertilised one by one. They eat a variety of arthropods and secrete peptides from their skin to avoid becoming prey themselves. Their population is assumed to be very large and not in any immediate danger.

== Taxonomy ==
Kassina senegalensis was first described in 1841 by André Marie Constant Duméril and Gabriel Bibron as Cystignathus senegalensis. Their description came from specimens that had been collected from ponds in Senegal, sent to them by an individual identified only as Mr. Heudelot. The genus Cystignathus was split into several new genera in 1853 by Charles Frédéric Girard, with senegalensis ending up as the only species of the newly erected genus Kassina. Six other species names, four alternate combinations, and eight proposed subspecies of this species have all been subsequently synonymised with the latest accepted name.

== Description ==
Senegal running frogs are relatively small and stocky. The vomer teeth of the upper mouth are arranged in two small groups. The tongue is heart-shaped. The Eustachian tube is quite small, and the eardrums are indistinct from the layer of skin covering them. Its four unwebbed fingers ordered from shortest to longest are its first, second, fourth, and third digits. The toes are also unwebbed. The eyes are large and somewhat protruding, while the head is shaped like an equilateral triangle, rounded at the tip. The entire body is smooth. In colour, Kassina senegalensis is greyish black, with brown longitudinal bands and spots of the same colour on various locations of the body, including the ears and eyes. They range in size from 35 to 40 millimetres (1.4 to 1.6 in). Males are a little smaller than females, and they have chocolate-coloured vocal sacs that can grow nearly twice their normal size during calls.

Kassina senegalensis eggs are about 3 millimetres (0.12 in) in diameter; this includes the jellylike membrane that covers them. Identification of tadpoles can be difficult, as there is much variation among them, a trait shared with other species in the genus Kassina. They grow up to 75 millimetres (3.0 in) long, with wide fins and humped backs.

== Distribution and habitat ==
Kassina senegalensis is found over a large portion of Africa, from Senegal in the west to Ethiopia and Somalia in the east, all the way south to South Africa. Its presence is uncertain in Burundi, the Democratic Republic of the Congo, Guinea-Bissau, Mauritania, and Togo. In the northern parts of its distribution, specifically Kenya and Tanzania, the relationship between its range and that of its relative Kassina somalica is not well understood. It is found in many different habitats, including savannas (both humid and dry), montane grasslands and shrublands, wetlands, and artificial environments (such as pastures and canals). They can be found at elevations as high as 2,000 metres (1.2 mi).

== Behaviour and ecology ==
=== Reproduction and life cycle ===
Kassina senegalensis can breed in both temporary and permanent sources of water, although due to their relatively long growth time, these are usually permanent or semi-permanent. Males call to attract females. The clasping male initiates the female's egg laying with their cloacae kept about 2 millimetres (0.079 in) apart. The male stays behind the female to fertilize eggs one at a time as the pair frequently moves to lay between one and fifteen eggs at each position. They are laid at a depth between 1 and 6 centimetres (0.39 and 2.36 in), quickly sinking to the bottom. A total of about 600 eggs are laid, which hatch after around six days. The presence of fish in breeding ponds shortens mating periods, whereas many other frog species avoid breeding in such conditions. All tested frog species, K. senegalensis included, immediately stopped breeding activity when the catfish species Clarias gariepinus is introduced. They take 50–60 days to complete metamorphosis.

=== Diet ===
In a study of K. senegalensis frogs in Cameroon, this species was identified as a generalist forager that primarily consumed Orthoptera insect species (36%), ants (24%), and spiders (10%). There was no clear size preference for prey.

=== Skin secretion ===
Senegal running frogs secrete the peptide Kassinakinin S from their skin, which induces the release of histamine from mast cells. Potential predators that consume this peptide experience painful inflammation that allows other secretory products to enter their bloodstream.

Frog skin secretion is a complex mixture of proteins and peptides which have a variety of pharmacological effects such as neurotoxicity and myotoxicity.

== Conservation ==
The International Union for the Conservation of Nature (IUCN) has rated K. senegalensis as a least-concern species, citing its extensive range and tolerance of many different habitats. It is unclear whether this species' large estimated population has significantly changed in recent years. On a local scale, Senegal running frogs may be affected by particularly severe habitat degradation. They are also sometimes traded internationally as pets, but not at a high enough level to be of special concern, according to the IUCN. Throughout its range, it is found in many ecologically protected areas.
