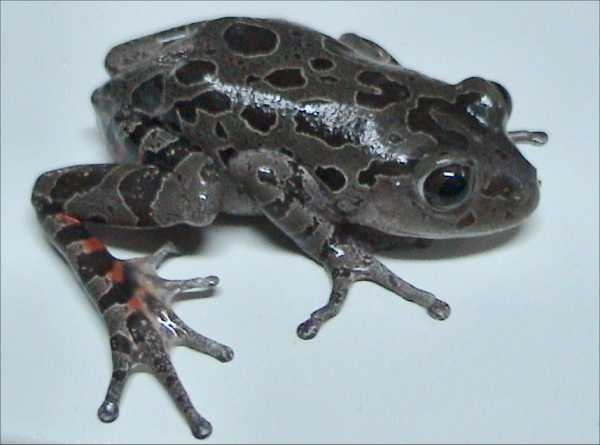

Conservation status
- Least Concern (IUCN 3.1)

Scientific classification
- Kingdom: Animalia
- Phylum: Chordata
- Class: Amphibia
- Order: Anura
- Family: Hyperoliidae
- Genus: Hylambates
- Species: H. maculatus

Binomial name
- Hylambates maculatus A.H.A. Duméril, 1853

Synonyms
- Kassina poweri Hoffman, 1944; Kassina maculata Stevens, 1974; Phlyctimantis maculatus Portik and Blackburn, 2016

= Hylambates maculatus =

Red-legged running frog

Species of amphibian

Hylambates maculatus is a species of frog in the family Hyperoliidae. They are silvery greyish-brown with dark brown to black spots, and derive their name from bright red coloring on the ventral side of their hind legs. Adult body length is typically 6 to 7.5 centimeters. These frogs have vertical pupils. Common names include red-legged running frog, brown-spotted tree frog, red-legged Kassina, red-legged pan frog, spotted running frog, tiger leg running frog, and vlei frog.

== Habitat ==
Hylambates maculatus is endemic to the tropical and sub-tropical areas of Africa's east coast (Kenya, Tanzania, Malawi, Mozambique, Zimbabwe, South Africa, and Eswatini). The frog thrives in varying terrain including shrubland, grassland, savannah, and forest as long as there exists a ready source of fresh water or high humidity. Its natural habitats are dry savanna, moist savanna, subtropical or tropical dry shrubland, subtropical or tropical moist shrubland, temperate grassland, subtropical or tropical dry lowland grassland, subtropical or tropical seasonally wet or flooded lowland grassland, swamps, intermittent freshwater lakes, freshwater marshes, intermittent freshwater marches, arable land, pastureland, rural gardens, heavily degraded former forest, water storage areas, and ponds. It is threatened by habitat loss.

== Behavior ==
Red-legged running frogs are nocturnal, and therefore somewhat elusive to humans—preferring to burrow under loose soil or hide in dense vegetation during the day. At night they take to climbing trees and tall shrubs to feed mainly on a diet of insects and insect larvae.

They are characterized by preferring a distinctive "walking" with the back legs instead of the more traditional frog-hopping.

== As pets ==
Because they are nocturnal and do require a significantly moist environment (80% relative humidity is recommended), they are not as common a pet as some other species of frog. However, being rather hardy and robust, they do survive well under appropriate basic conditions. A source of UV light is not required, and ambient temperature of 72 to 77 °F (22 to 25 °C) is sufficient. Both a thermometer and hygrometer should be present. Moss or coconut fiber should be used as substrate for burrowing, with both wet and dry ground areas within the enclosure. A basin or bowl of clean, fresh water is necessary. Misting of fresh water should occur twice a day at the wet end of the tank. Plants (real or artificial) should be present for climbing. A diet of live crickets, mealworms, or flies is appropriate, and size of food should be limited to the width of the space between the frog's eyes.
