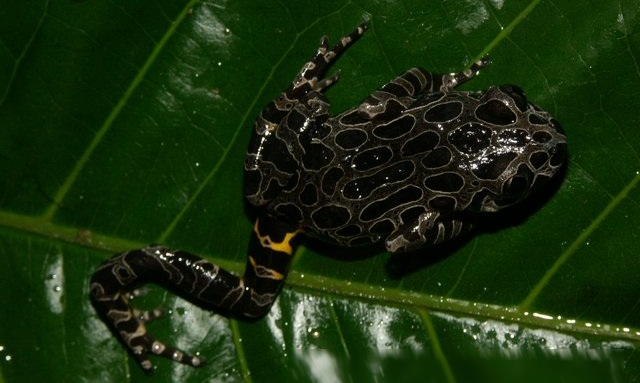

Conservation status
- Least Concern (IUCN 3.1)

Scientific classification
- Kingdom: Animalia
- Phylum: Chordata
- Class: Amphibia
- Order: Anura
- Family: Hyperoliidae
- Genus: Kassina
- Species: K. maculosa

Binomial name
- Kassina maculosa (Sternfeld, 1917)

Synonyms
- Megalixalus maculosus Sternfeld, 1917

= Kassina maculosa =

Species of frog

Kassina maculosa is a species of frog in the family Hyperoliidae. It is found in Cameroon, Central African Republic, and northern Democratic Republic of the Congo, and possibly also in northern Republic of the Congo. Its natural habitats are lowland secondary forests and savanna, and montane forests and grasslands. It tolerates habitat modification and is also found in farm bush. Breeding takes place in standing water, possibly also in streams at high altitudes.
