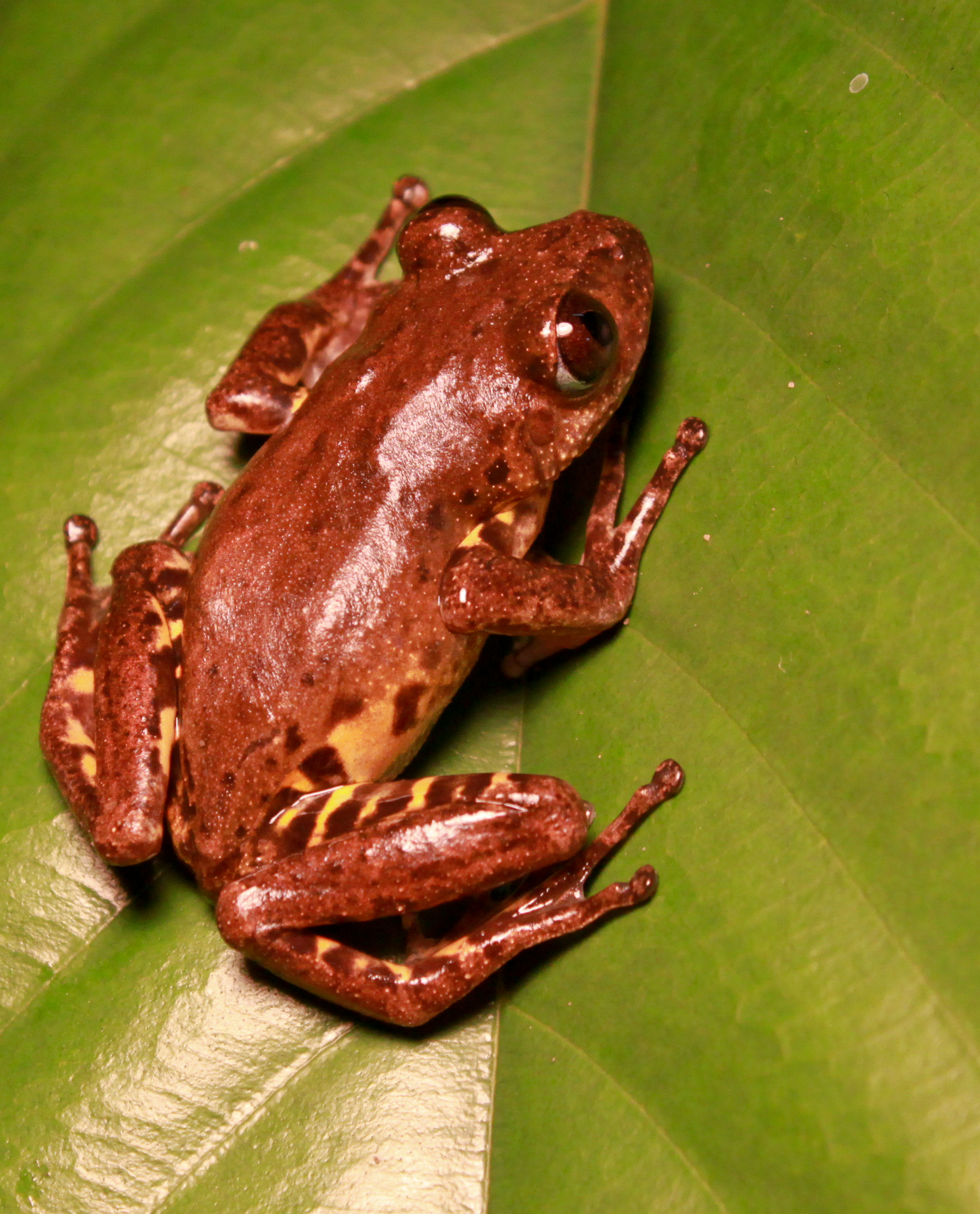

Conservation status
- Least Concern (IUCN 3.1)

Scientific classification
- Kingdom: Animalia
- Phylum: Chordata
- Class: Amphibia
- Order: Anura
- Family: Hyperoliidae
- Genus: Hylambates
- Species: H. leonardi

Binomial name
- Hylambates leonardi (Boulenger, 1906)

Synonyms
- Phlyctimantis leonardi Laurent and Crombaz, 1950; Kassina leonardi Dubois, 1987

= Hylambates leonardi =

Species of frog

Hylambates leonardi (common name - Olive Striped Frog) is a species of frog in the family Hyperoliidae. It is found in west-central Africa in eastern Cameroon, Equatorial Guinea, Gabon, Republic of the Congo, and western Democratic Republic of the Congo. It is presumed to occur in the Cabinda enclave of Angola. It is in a species complex with congenerics Hylambates verrucosus and Hylambates boulengeri, with members potentially being the same species. Frogs are medium to large (45 - 59 mm), with smooth skin.

It occurs in secondary forest, forest clearings and farm bush. Breeding takes place in grassy areas with deep temporary pools, a more exposed calling habitat than similar species (which prefer denser forest). It is a common and adaptable species but cannot withstand complete opening up of its habitat.

Individuals from Cameroon tested positive for Bd, suggesting that this species may be at risk from chytridiomycosis, although no deaths or ill effects from the fungus have been observed to date.

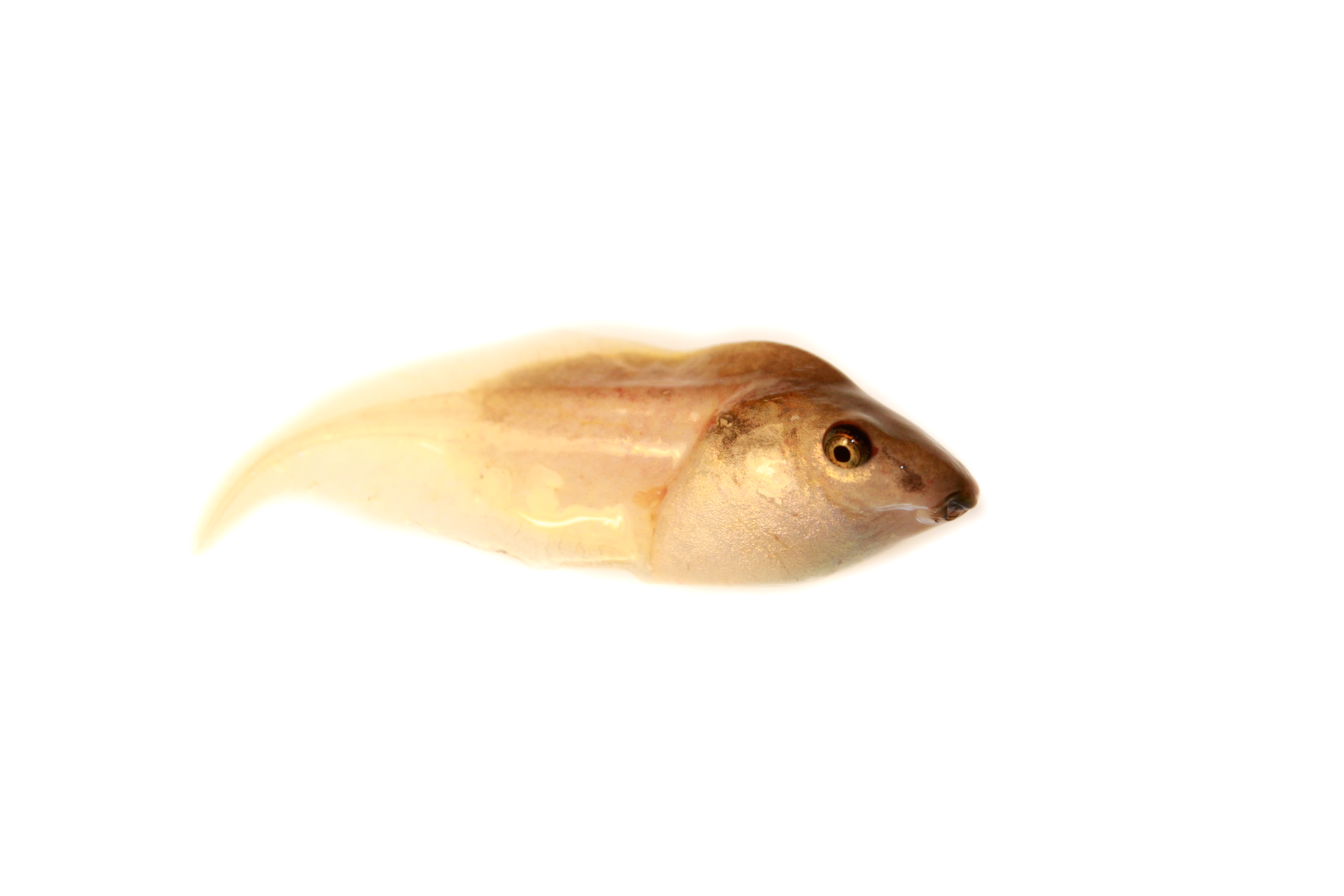
Tadpole

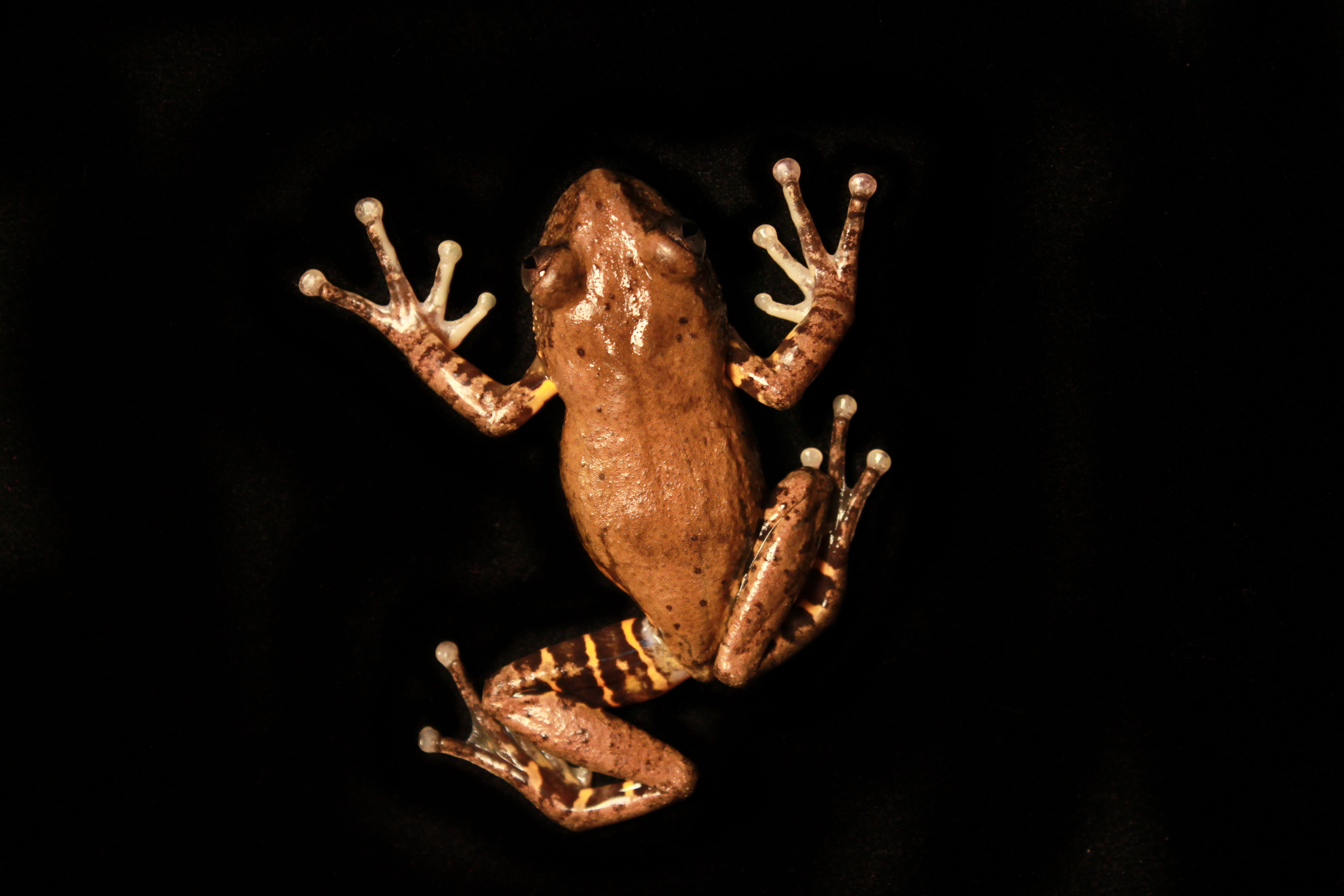
Dorsal view

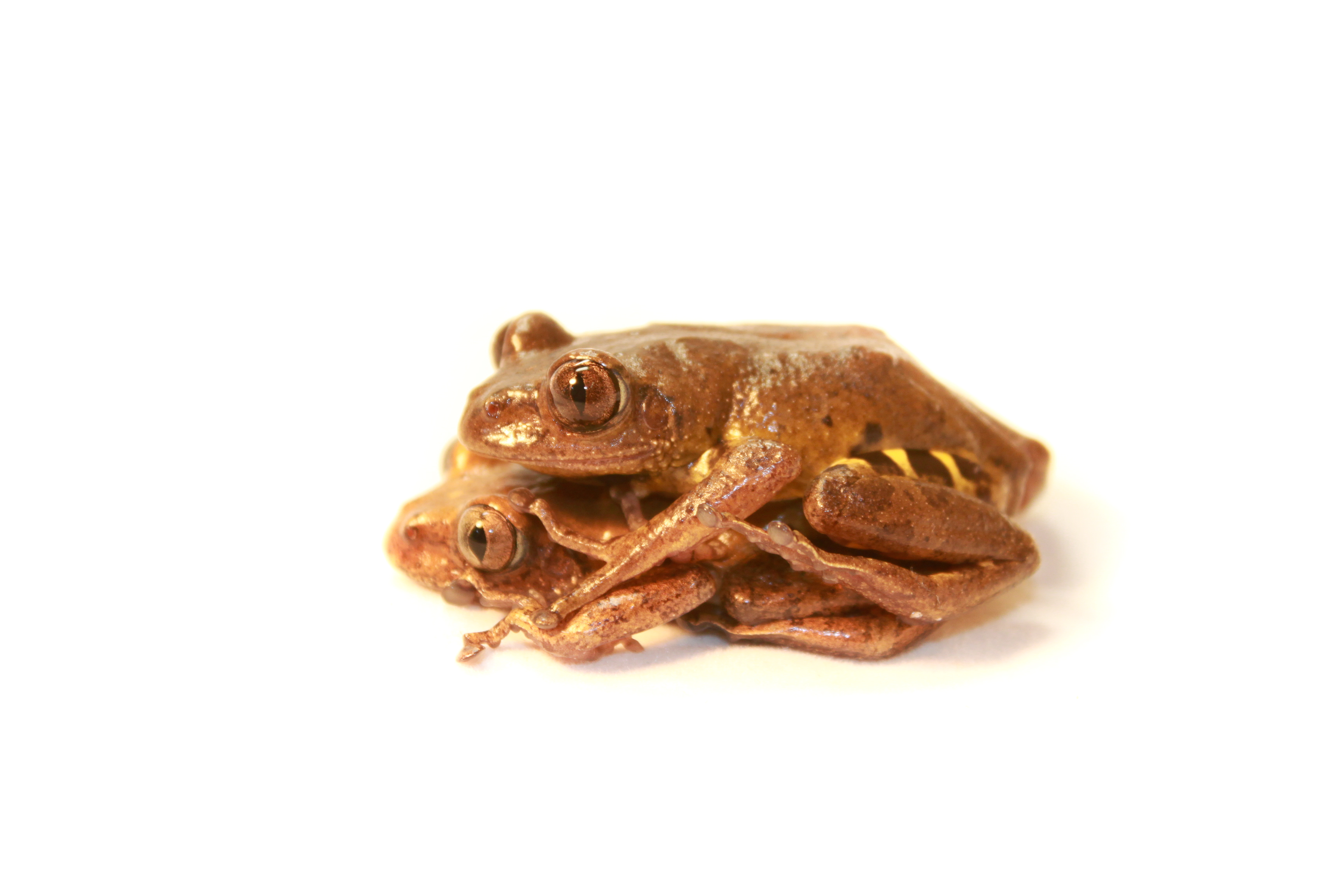
Mating
