= Arne Schiøtz =

Danish herpetologist (1932–2019)

- Born: 29 January 1932; Nørre-Sundby, Jutland, Denmark
- Died: 11 May 2019 (aged 87)
- Education: Aalborg Cathedral School; University of Copenhagen (MA, PhD)

Arne Schiøtz was a Danish herpetologist, conservationist, and aquarium director. He is known for his contributions to the systematics of hyperoliid reed frogs from Africa, and his role as director of Denmark's Aquarium. He was assistant to the Director for Copenhagen Zoo from 1959 to 1965, chairman of Nordisk Herpetologisk Forening (Nordic Herpetological Society) from 1962 to 1974, Director of Denmark's Aquarium from 1964 to 1996, the Secretary General for World Wide Fund for Nature (WWF) in Denmark from 1972 to 1978, and Director of Conservation for WWF from 1980 to 1983. In 1990, Schiøtz was posted by DANIDA to Bhutan for three years to aid in the establishment of an environmental ministry.

== Education and personal life ==
Schiøtz was born in Nørre-Sundby, Jutland, Denmark to Erik S. Schiøtz and Martine Schiøtz (née Larssen). His father, a banker, encouraged his interest in animals, and the family kept numerous animals at home. He went to school in Aalborg, and later entered his studies at the University of Copenhagen in 1950. He also performed military duties in Greenland and Thule. Schiøtz received his cand.mag. in Biology in 1958, and his dr.phil. in 1967, both from the University of Copenhagen. He was married to his wife, Vibeke Schiøtz (née Søager), in 1962, and they raised two sons.

== Career ==
Schiøtz was invited to take part in an expedition from 1958 to 1959 together with the University of Copenhagen Zoological Museum to Nigeria, where he focused on thermoregulation in lizards. This trip sparked his interest in treefrogs, and between 1960 and 2005, he undertook numerous further expeditions in various parts of East and West Africa to study and collect these frogs. His taxonomic work resulted in 38 new species and subspecies, several published in substantial volumes including The Treefrogs of Eastern Africa and Treefrogs of Africa. He made bioacoustic recordings of the species he studied, many of which he also published; the first to do so systematically and intensively.

Schiøtz was offered a position as Director of the National Aquarium Denmark (Danmarks Akvarium) in 1964, succeeding Mogens Højgaard. He served as its director until he retired in 1996, and oversaw two stages of expansions of the aquarium.

Schiøtz had a significant role in the establishment of the Danish branch of the World Wide Fund for Nature, serving as its Secretary General from its founding in 1972 by Prince Henrik of Denmark, to 1978. When this honorary position became too taxing, he resigned and became a board member. But in 1980, he was asked to serve as Director of Conservation for WWF-International, for which he relocated to Switzerland for three years. He is credited with having shifted the focus of WWF to emphasise habitat conservation and fauna conservation, instead of species conservation.

== Honorifics ==
Several species have been named after Schiøtz:

- Leptopelis ocellatus schiotzi Laurent, 1973
- Astylosternus schioetzi Amiet, 1978
- Cardioglossa schioetzi Amiet, 1982
- Kassina schioetzi Rödel, Grafe, Rudolf & Ernst, 2002
- Phrynobatrachus schioetzi Blackburn & Rödel 2011
- Ptychadena arnei Perret, 1997

== Awards ==
- Rungstedlund Prize in 1996
- Prize for Exceptional Contributions to African Herpetology by the African Herpetological Society in 2008.
- Honorary membership of WWF-International in 2000
