= Wami River =

River in Morogoro and Pwani Region, Tanzania

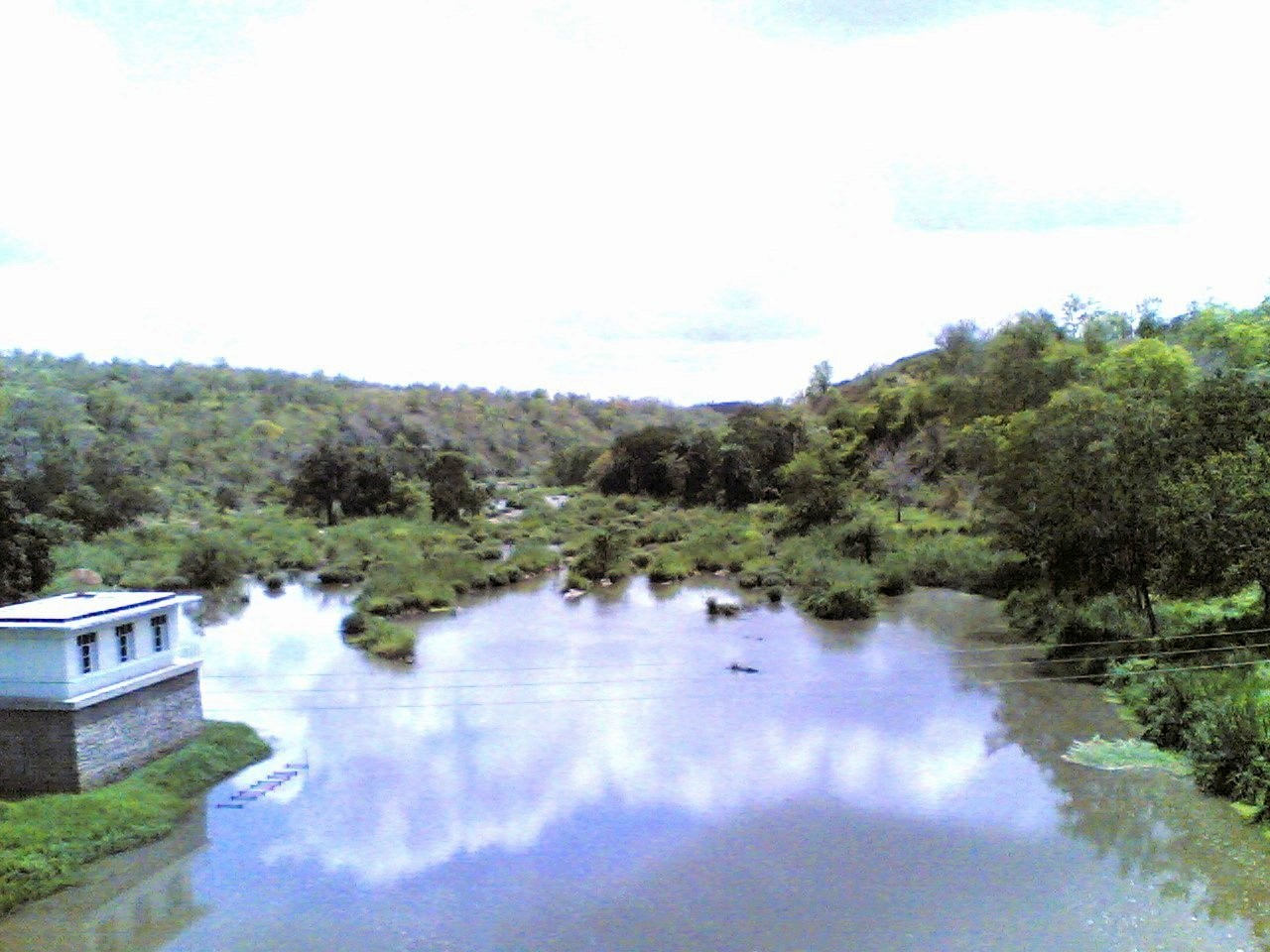

Location
- Country: Tanzania
- Region: Pwani Region
- Region: Morogoro Region

Physical characteristics
- Source
  - location: Morogoro Region
- Mouth
  - location: at Saadani in the Indian Ocean, Pwani Region, Tanzania
  - coordinates: 6°7′S 38°49′E
  - elevation: 0 m (0 ft)
- Basin size: 43,946 km^{2} (16,968 sq mi)
- Discharge
  - average: 60.6 m^{3}/s (2,140 cu ft/s)

Basin features
- Tributaries
  - left: Mkata
  - right: Lukigura; Mjonga; Chogoati

The Wami River is a river located in Pwani Region, Tanzania. The headwaters of the Wami and its tributaries originate in the Eastern Arc Mountains of Morogoro Region. The river then flows northeastward through of Pwani Region to empty into the Indian Ocean west of Zanzibar Island.

The Wami drains a catchment of 43,946 km². The catchment extends through four ecological regions. Coastal forests extend along the Indian Ocean coast. Further inland, woodlands and seasonally-flooded grasslands cover the plains of the central catchment. These plains are bounded on the northwest by the Rubeho, Ukakuru, Nguru, and Nguu mountains, some of the Eastern Arc ranges. The Eastern Arc Mountains intercept moisture-laden winds from the Indian Ocean, and receive more rainfall than the surrounding lowlands. Most of the rainfall occurs in the November-to-May wet season, although mist and light rain occur at higher elevations during the dry season months. The mountains' windward eastern and southern faces receive more rainfall the northern and western slopes. These rains sustain montane forests as well as the Wami's tributary rivers and streams. The Eastern Arc forests are important to both sustaining and moderating the rivers' flow.

The seasonal Kinyasangwe River extends west of the Eastern Arc mountains to Dodoma, draining the southern portion of the semi-arid Maasai Steppe, which is in the rain shadow of the Eastern Arc Mountains.

Only after leaving the Mkata River basin on the northern edge of the Mikumi National Park is its name Wami.

Due to deforestation and climatic changes in the region the runoff decreased.

Near its mouth the Wami River forms the southern border of the Saadani National Park, the only coastal national park in Tanzania.

== Hydrometry ==
The river flow observed over 30 years (1954–84) in Mandera a town about 50 km above the mouth. The at Mandera observed average annual flow during this period was 60.6 m³ / s fed by an area of about 82% of the total catchment area of the River.

The average monthly flow of the river Wami hydrological station of Mandera (in m³ / s )
(Calculated using the data for a period of 30 years, 1954–84)

== Gallery ==
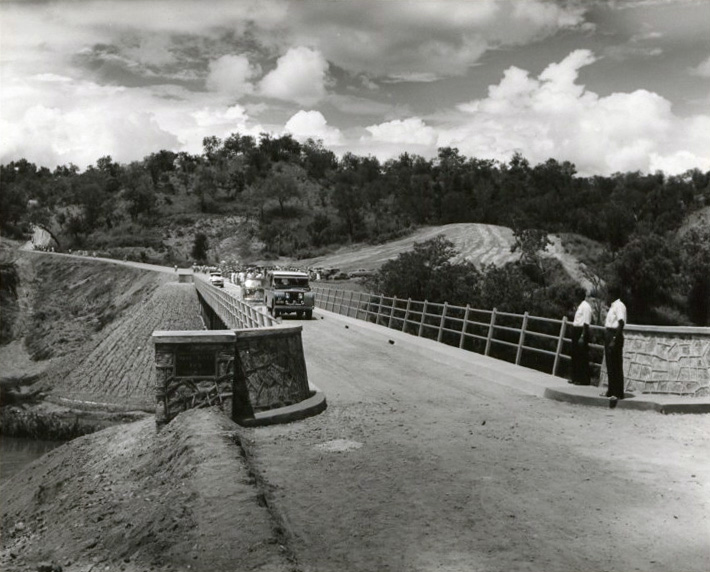
Opening of Mandera Bridge

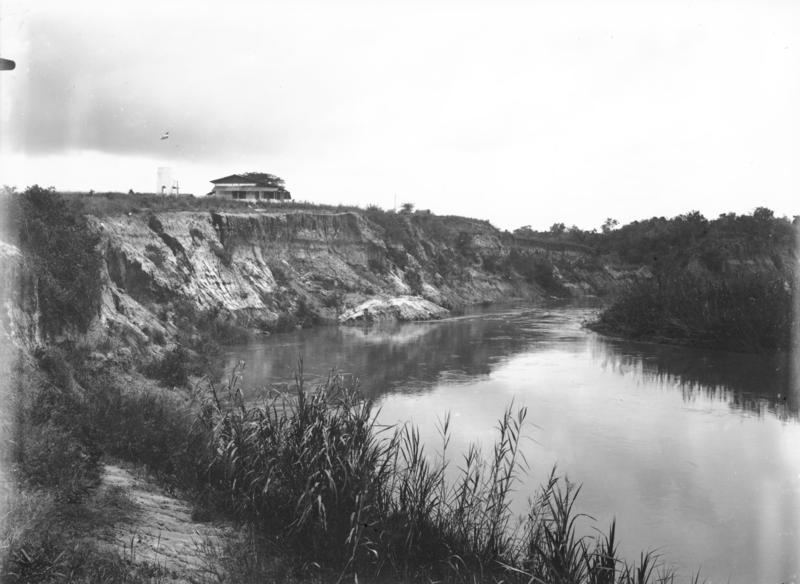
Wami River between 1906 and 1918 at Kissanke

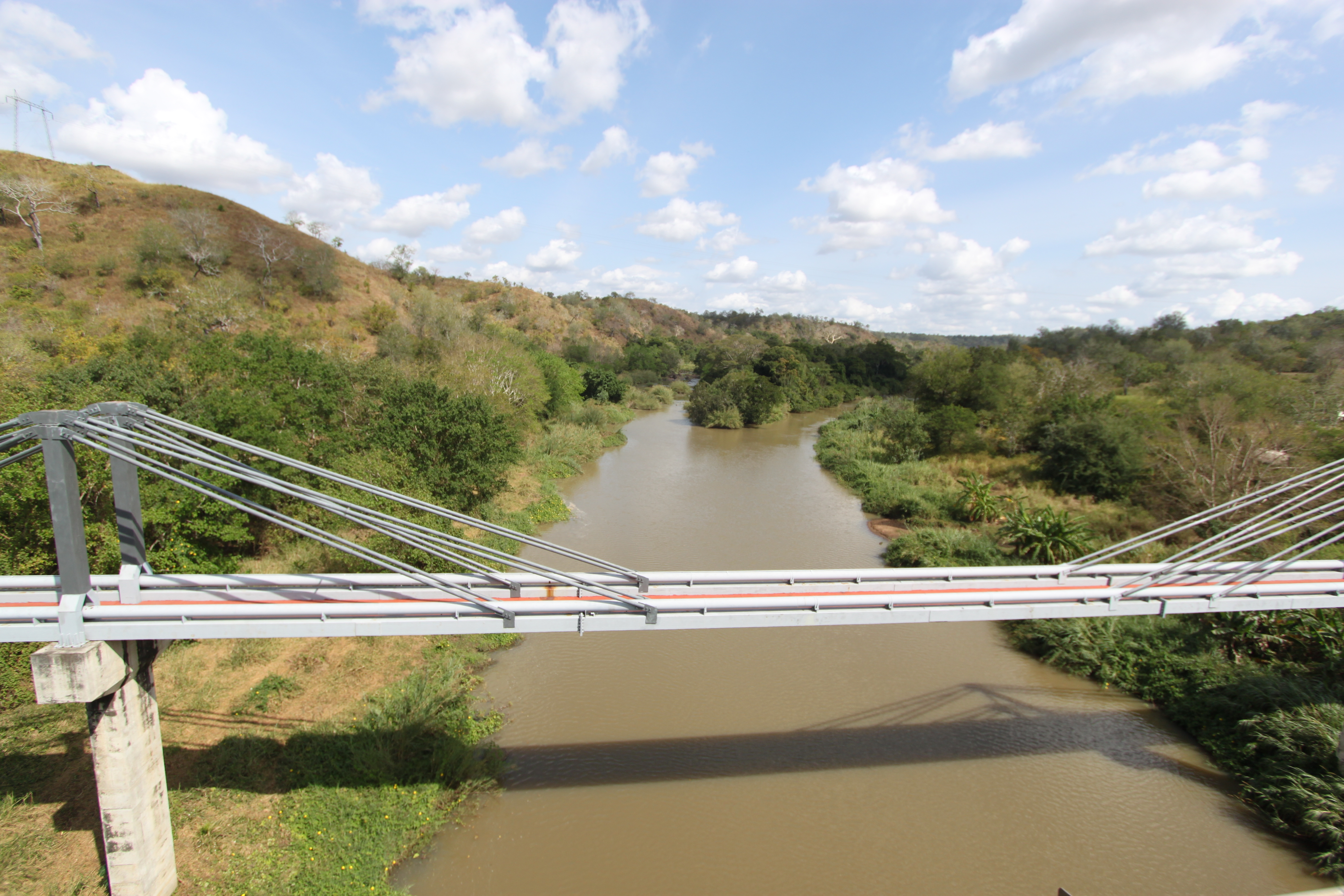
2012

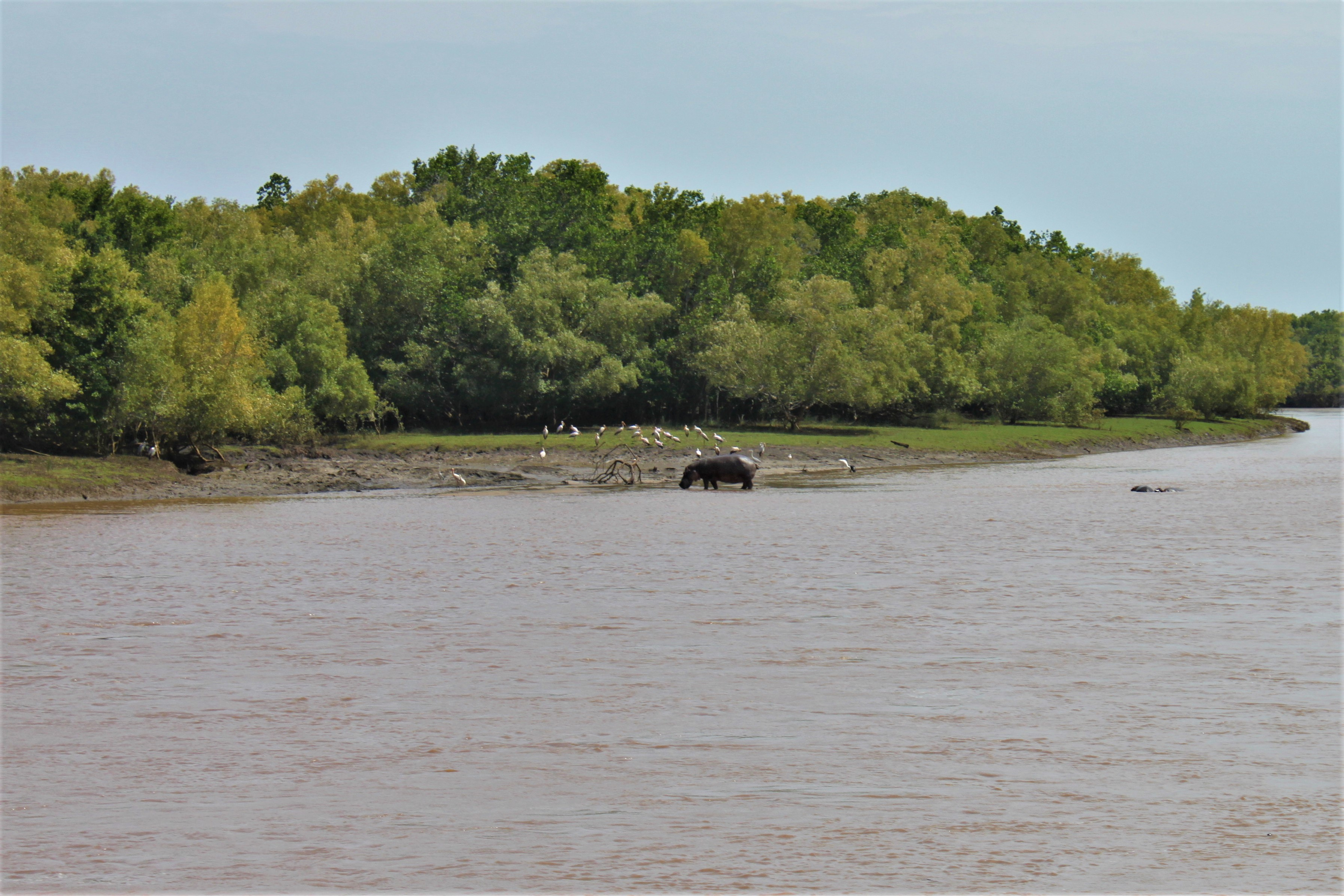
Hippopotamus amphibius
