= Malundwe Mountain =

Mountain in Tanzania

Coordinates: 07°24′S 37°18′E

Malundwe Mountains

Highest point
- Elevation: 1,290 m (4,230 ft)

Geography
- Location: Morogoro Region, Tanzania

Malundwe Mountain, also known as Malundwe Hill, is a mountain in Tanzania. It is located in Mikumi National Park in Morogoro Region.

== Geography ==
Malundwe consists of three peaks along a ridge running north and south. Malundwe's south peak is the highest point in the park, reaching 1,290 metres (4,232 ft) elevation. Malundwe is the highest of a belt of hills that extend east and west through the park, connecting the Uluguru Mountains to the northeast with the Uvidunda Mountains to the west.

Malundwe's eastern slopes drain into the Ruvu River, its western slopes drain into the Great Ruaha River, and the northern slope drains into the Wami River.

== Ecology ==
Malundwe is covered with miombo woodland above 700 meters elevation. A patch of evergreen submontane forest covers the peaks, with an area 4.5 km², descending to 800 meters on wetter eastern face of the peaks. The forests are an enclave of the Eastern Arc forests, which extend across higher elevations in the Eastern Arc Mountains of Tanzania and Kenya. 228 species of trees, shrubs, lianas, herbs, and ferns live in the forest. Eight tree species found in the submontane forests – Allanblackia stuhlmannii, Beilschmiedia kweo, Dasylepis integra, Diospyros amaniensis, Leptonychia usambarensis, Leptonychia usambarensis, Polyscias stuhlmannii, Uvariodendron usambarense, and Zenkerella perplexa – are endemic to the Eastern Arc forests. Another three – Drypetes usambarica, Greenwayodendron suaveolens, and Isoberlinia scheffleri – are found only in the Eastern Arc forests and the evergreen coastal forests. These endemic and near-endemic trees are 12% of the trees species found in the forest.

The submontane forests are home to the Usambara Thrush (Turdus roehli), which is endemic to the Eastern Arc forests, and to eight other bird species which are near-endemic, found in the Eastern Arc forests and one other ecoregion – Shelley's greenbul (Andropadus masukuensis), Chapin's apalis (Apalis chapini), Forest batis (Batis mixta), Fülleborn's boubou (Laniarius fuelleborni), Spot-throat (Modulatrix stictigula), Green-headed oriole (Oriolus chlorocephalus), Sharpe's akalat (Sheppardia sharpei), and the Green barbet (Stactolaema olivacea).

== Conservation ==
The mountain has been part of Mikumi National Park since its establishment in 1964.
