= Eastern Arc forests =

Forest ecoregion in Tanzania and Kenya

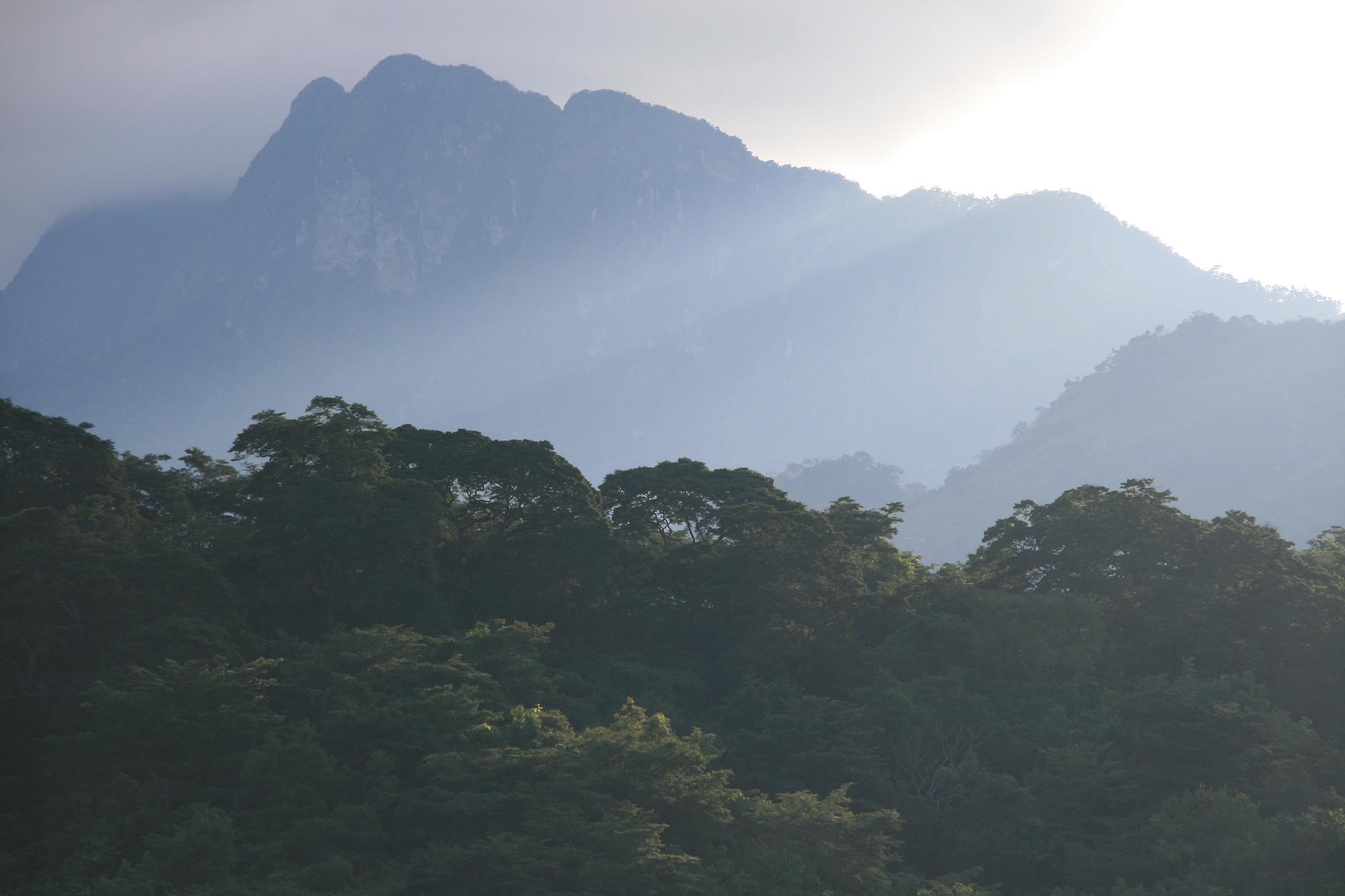
- Udzungwa Mountains, Tanzania

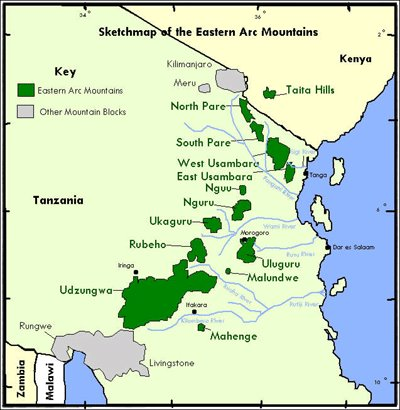
- Map of the Eastern Arc Mountains

Ecology
- Realm: Afrotropical
- Biome: tropical and subtropical moist broadleaf forests
- Borders: Eastern miombo woodlands; Northern Acacia–Commiphora bushlands and thickets; Northern Zanzibar–Inhambane coastal forest mosaic, Southern Acacia–Commiphora bushlands and thickets

Geography
- Area: 23,800 km^{2} (9,200 sq mi)
- Countries: Kenya; Tanzania
- Elevation: 800 - 2635 metres
- Coordinates: 8.6°S 35.5°E

Conservation
- Conservation status: critical/endangered
- Global 200: yes
- Protected: 20.31%

The Eastern Arc forests is a montane tropical moist forest ecoregion of eastern Africa. The ecoregion comprises several separate highland areas above 800 meters in Kenya, and (mostly) Tanzania.

== Setting ==
The Eastern Arc forests extend across a total of 23,800 km^{2} (9,200 sq. mi.) of mountainous landscape from the Taita Hills on Kenya-Tanzania border through central Tanzania to the Udzungwa Mountains in the southwest. The ecoregion includes numerous mountain blocks separated by lowland areas. The mountain form a broad arc curving to the northwest and southwest, and include the Taita Hills, North and South Pare Mountains, East and West Usambara Mountains, Nguu Mountains, North and South Nguru Mountains, Ukaguru Mountains, Uluguru Mountains, Rubeho Mountains, Uvidunda Mountains, and Udzungwa Mountains. The ecoregion includes two outlying mountains, the Mahenge Mountains south of the Udzungwas and Malundwe Mountain in Mikumi National Park.

At lower elevations, the mountain forests are mostly surrounded by Miombo woodlands. The southeastern-facing slopes, which receive more moisture-laden winds off the Indian Ocean, are home to transitional forests from 250 to 350 meters elevation up to 800 meters elevation. These transitional forests more closely resemble the lowland coastal forests to the east, and are considered part of the Northern Zanzibar–Inhambane coastal forest mosaic ecoregion.

To the southwest, the Makambako Gap, a region of Miombo woodland, separate the Eastern Arc forests from the Southern Rift montane forest–grassland mosaic ecoregion in Tanzania's Southern Highlands.

== Flora ==
The main plant communities are upper montane forests (2635–1800 m), lower montane forests (1250–1800 m) and submontane forests (800–1250 m). The upper montane forests are dwarfed and lichen-covered at the highest elevations. The ecoregion also includes areas of high-elevation grassland, heathland, and bamboo forest.

The forests are home to many endemic species including over 800 plants, and are the original homeland of the African violet (Saintpaulia) and the Busy Lizzie (Impatiens).

== Fauna ==
The ecoregion is rich in wildlife with many endemic species of birds, and some mammals, while endemic amphibians include five species of reed frogs (Hyperolius), two species of forest treefrogs (Leptopelis), five tree toads (Nectophrynoides), four species of Microhylidae, and five Caeciliidae. Endemic reptiles include ten species of chameleons (seven Chamaeleo and three Rhampholeon), three worm snakes (Typhlops), and six Colubridae snakes. Invertebrates show very high levels of endemism too. Furthermore, study of the wildlife on these isolated hills is important for research into evolutionary pathways.

== Threats and conservation ==
These wet hillsides are highly populated with farming communities and most forest has been lost, especially on the lower slopes.

== Protected areas ==
20.31% of the ecoregion is in protected areas. The largest protected area is Udzungwa Mountains National Park. Other protected areas include Mkomazi National Park, Tsavo West National Park, Amani Nature Forest Reserve, Chome Nature Forest Reserve, Nilo Nature Forest Reserve, Mkingu Nature Forest Reserve, and Uluguru Nature Forest Reserve. There are also protected areas around a number of reservoirs, as this region is central to Tanzania's water supply.
