= Munissi's shrew =

Conservation status
- Least Concern (IUCN 3.1)

Scientific classification
- Kingdom: Animalia
- Phylum: Chordata
- Class: Mammalia
- Order: Eulipotyphla
- Family: Soricidae
- Genus: Crocidura
- Species: C. munissii

Binomial name
- Crocidura munissii Stanley, Hutterer, Giarla & Esselstyn, 2015

Species of mammal

Munissi's shrew (Crocidura munissii) is a species of mammal in the family Soricidae. It is endemic to Tanzania.

It is known only from Rubeho, Udzungwa, Ukaguru and Uluguru mountains. It inhabits montane forests. It has a snout-to-vent length of 75–106 mm (3.0–4.2 in), a tail of 66–95 mm (2.6–3.7 in) and a weight of 9.5–19.5 g (0.34–0.69 oz), with dark brown fur. This species was named after Tanzanian mammalogist Maiko J. Munissi, in honor of his study of montane mammals of Tanzania.
