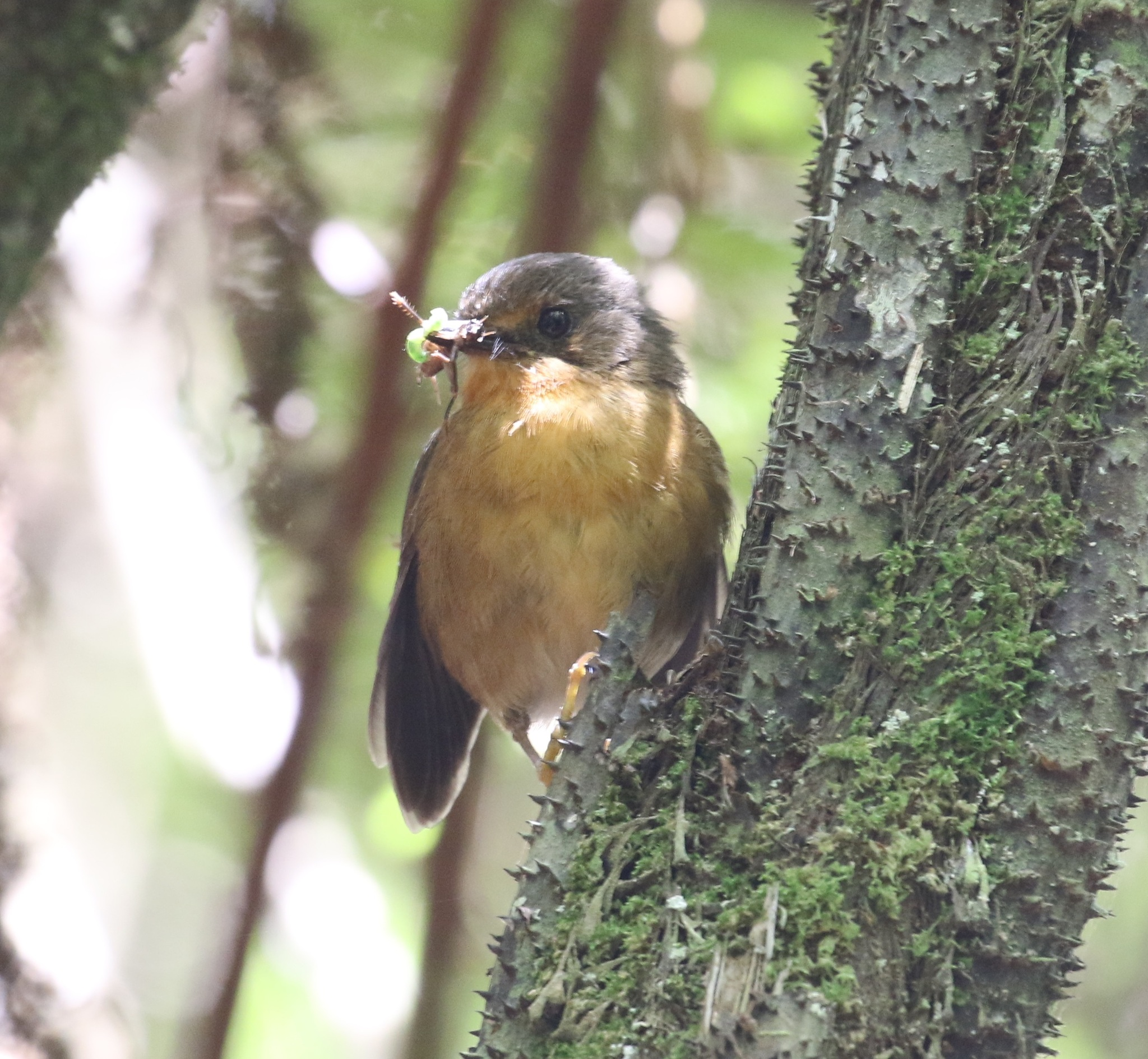

Conservation status
- Endangered (IUCN 3.1)

Scientific classification
- Kingdom: Animalia
- Phylum: Chordata
- Class: Aves
- Order: Passeriformes
- Family: Muscicapidae
- Genus: Sheppardia
- Species: S. aurantiithorax

Binomial name
- Sheppardia aurantiithorax Beresford, Fjeldså & Kiure, 2004

= Rubeho akalat =

Species of bird

The Rubeho akalat (Sheppardia aurantiithorax) is a member of the Old World flycatcher family, (Muscicapiidae), known from the Rubeho Mountains in Dodoma Region. The mountains are a part of the Eastern Arc of Tanzania. Akalats trapped in 1989 here were assumed to be an isolated population of Iringa akalat which occurs c. 150 km to the south, but further specimens collected in 2000 led to the description of the bird as a new species. The bird's English name relates to its type locality, Rubeho Mountains, Morogoro; the scientific name to the ochraceous colour on its throat and upper breast.

The Rubeho akalat is found in the Rubeho Mountains, the Wota Mountains northwest of the Rubehos, the Ukaguru Mountains, and Mount Kiboriani northwest of the Ukugurus, between 1660 and 2400 meters elevation. The species is thought to be fairly common in montane forests within its small range, but its very limited distribution has let to it being classified as Endangered species in the 2008 IUCN Red List.
