= Beilschmiedia kweo =

Conservation status
- Least Concern (IUCN 3.1)

Scientific classification
- Kingdom: Plantae
- Clade: Embryophytes
- Clade: Tracheophytes
- Clade: Angiosperms
- Clade: Magnoliids
- Order: Laurales
- Family: Lauraceae
- Genus: Beilschmiedia
- Species: B. kweo

Binomial name
- Beilschmiedia kweo (Mildbr.) Robyns & R.Wilczek

Synonyms
- Tylostemon kweo Mildbr.

Species of flowering plant

Beilschmiedia kweo is a species of flowering plant in the family Lauraceae. It is a tree endemic to eastern Tanzania. It a canopy tree, which grows 24 to 30 metres tall. It is native to the eastern Usambara Mountains, Uluguru Mountains, and Udzungwa Mountains, where it grows in moist submontane and montane tropical forest from 800 to 1,800 metres elevation.
