= Uvidunda Mountains =

Mountain range in Morogoro Region of Tanzania

Coordinates: 07°34′17″S 36°55′03″E

Uvindunda Mountains
- Milima ya Uvindunda (Swahili)

Highest point
- Elevation: 1,500 m (4,900 ft)

Geography
- Country: Tanzania
- Region: Morogoro Region
- District: Kilosa District
- Parent range: Eastern Arc Mountains

The Uvindunda Mountains (Milima ya Uvidunda in Swahili) are a mountain range in eastern Tanzania. The mountains are named after the Vidunda people native to the mountains in Kilosa District of Morogoro Region.

Uvidunda Mountains located with more than 6 untouched waterfalls on the trail.The Uvidunda Mountains Cultural Tourism Enterprise, initiated by conservation tourism enterprise Mikumi Eco & Cultural Tourism is the one develop and manage Chizua Waterfalls, Kigaga Waterfalls, Mzombe waterfall, Mululu waterfalls, Ibwedunghu waterfall, Makene Ngoroma Trail and Uvidunda Zipline.People living on Uvidunda Mountains are known as WaVidunda, their language is Chividunda.

== Geography ==
The Uvidunda mountains are part of the Eastern Arc Mountains. The range consists of a single block with three distinct peaks, Chonwe, Mgwila, and Migomberama, which exceed 1500 meters elevation. The Rubeho Mountains are close to the northwest, and the Udzungwa Mountains are immediately to the southwest across the Great Ruaha River. Southeast of the mountains the Great Ruaha river emerges onto a plain. Malundwe Mountain lies to the east in Mikumi National Park. The Mkata Plain opens to the northeast.

== Ecology ==
The mountains are covered in miombo woodland at lower elevations, and evergreen Eastern Arc forests at higher elevations. The remaining forests are generally limited to the valleys, likely due to extensive forest burning and land clearance for agriculture.

A 2006 survey found that the largest intact forest block was the Iyunji (aka Chonwe) forest near the villages of Vidunda, Chonwe, and Udunghu. Based on satellite and ground observations, it was estimated that the forest has been reduced from 471.3 ha in 1975 to 356 ha in 2006, a reduction of nearly 25%. Larger areas of relatively intact open woodland and bushland were found in the western part of the mountains. Large areas of the mountains had been cleared for agriculture, and much of the remaining woodland and bushland was degraded from excessive burning and timber harvesting.

No forest or nature reserves have been designated in the Uvidunda Mountains, although the government has listed Chonwe forest as a 'suggested' forest reserve. A 2011 assessment of priorities for new or expanded protected areas in Tanzania ranked the Uvidunda Mountains as medium priority among the 27 areas assessed.
