= Lupanga =

- Location within Tanzania

Highest point
- Elevation: 2,150 m (7,050 ft)
- Coordinates: 6.8625°S 37.7092°E

Geography
- Location: Tanzania
- Parent range: Uluguru Mountains

Lupanga is a mountain in Tanzania, close to the town of Morogoro.

The top peak is around 2,150 meters above sea level. It is part of the Uluguru Mountains.
