= Jon Fjeldså =

Norwegian-born Danish ornithologist

Jon Fjeldså (born 13 December 1942) is a Norwegian-born Danish ornithologist and bird artist. Fjeldså has authored several books and published numerous research papers, primarily focusing on grebes, birds of the Andes and Eastern Arc Mountains, and evolution of passerines. He is an emeritus professor at the University of Copenhagen.

== Early life and military service ==
Jon Fjeldså was born in southwestern Norway in Hauge to two Danish parents, Anine Knudsen and Per Fjeldså, and grew up in Bodø. Per Fjeldså would often take his sons on nature trips to look at animals, and early on Jon became particularly interested in birds. His focus on grebes started when he was young and found a trusting pair of horned grebes, allowing him to closely observe their behavior.

Growing up after World War II, he and his playmates also played with leftover ammunition and weapons found in the region. After finishing secondary school, he served in the Norwegian army on the Russian-Norwegian border in 1961–62. With his photographic memory and abilities with a binocular and as an illustrator (photography at Russia's border was strictly illegal), he was able to bring new information and details to Norway on an improved version of the Russian AK-47 Kalashnikov rifle, and made detailed plans of the exterior of Russian border stations.

== Later life and ornithology ==
After leaving the Norwegian army, he began to study biology at the University of Bergen, graduating in 1970. He then joined the Copenhagen Zoological Museum in Denmark as a curator, inspired by Finn Salomonsen and its international research. In 1974, he published his PhD thesis on the horned grebe and the following year he received his doctorate at the University of Copenhagen. He became a professor of zoology at the University of Copenhagen in 1996. The Andes of South America is home to many species of grebes, which initially brought him to the region. His international field work played an important role in the foundation of the tissue collection (blood samples, etc) at the Danish Natural History Museum, which today houses the second-largest bird DNA collection in the world.

Fjeldså has authored and co-authored several books, notably the Guide to the young of European precocial birds (1977), Birds of the High Andes (1990, co-authored with Niels Krabbe), The Grebes: Podicipedidae (2004) and The Largest Avian Radiation: The Evolution of Perching Birds, or the Order Passeriformes (2020, primary author and editor together with Les Christidis and Per G. P. Ericson), has illustrated or otherwise provided information for many books, and has published hundreds of research papers, primarily focusing on grebes, birds of the Andes and Eastern Arc Mountains, and evolution of the passerines. He has described several bird species and subspecies from South America and Africa, especially the Andes and Eastern Arc Mountains, such as Cranioleuca henricae (Bolivian spinetail) from Bolivia, Laterallus jamaicensis tuerosi (Junin crake) and Atlapetes melanopsis (black-spectacled brushfinch) from Peru, and Batis crypta (dark batis), Sheppardia aurantiithorax (Rubeho akalat) and Xenoperdix udzungwensis (Udzungwa forest partridge) from Tanzania. Epinecrophylla haematonota fjeldsaai (Yasuni antwren) was named in his honour.
