= Northern Zanzibar–Inhambane coastal forest mosaic =

Tropical forest ecoregion of East Africa

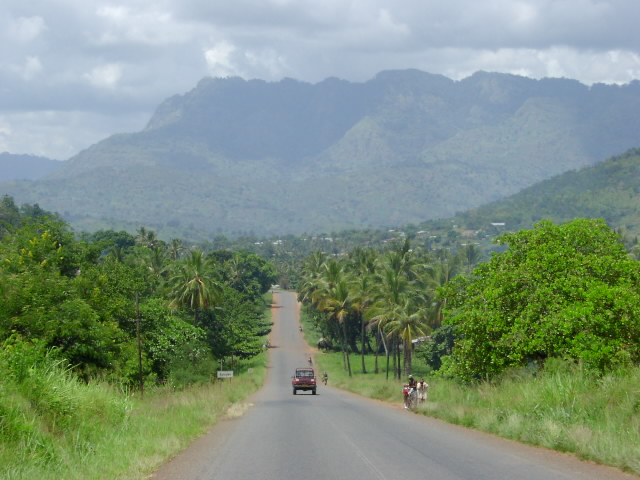
- Road to Korogwe, Tanzania

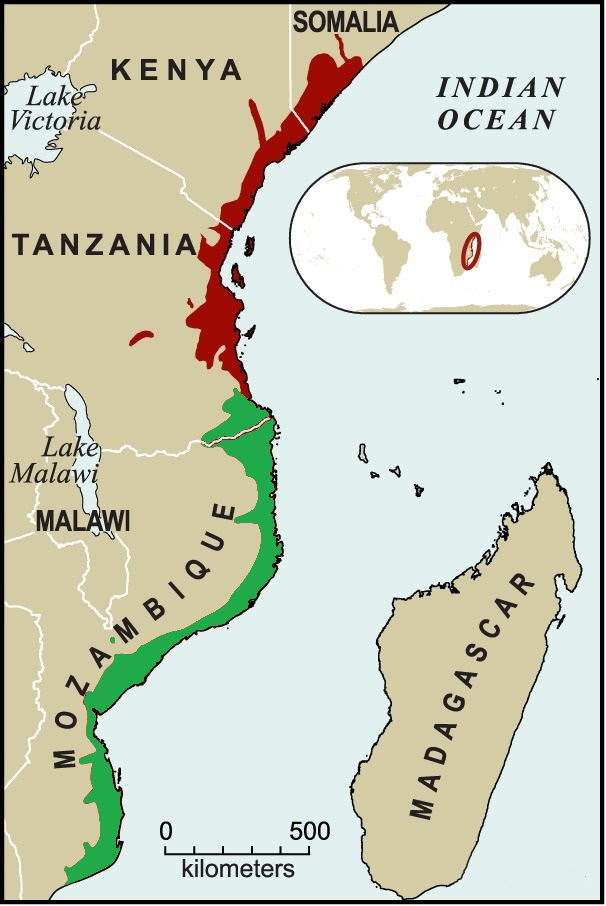
- Northern Zanzibar–Inhambane coastal forest mosaic Southern Zanzibar–Inhambane coastal forest mosaic

Ecology
- Realm: Afrotropical
- Biome: tropical and subtropical moist broadleaf forests
- Borders: List: East African mangroves; Eastern Arc forests; Eastern miombo woodlands; Northern Acacia–Commiphora bushlands and thickets; Somali Acacia–Commiphora bushlands and thickets; Southern Acacia–Commiphora bushlands and thickets; Southern Zanzibar–Inhambane coastal forest mosaic

Geography
- Area: 111,900 km^{2} (43,200 mi^{2})
- Countries: Kenya; Somalia; Tanzania
- Coordinates: 2.45°S 40.35°E

Conservation
- Conservation status: Critical/endangered
- Global 200: East African Coastal Forests
- Protected: 18.4%

Northern Zanzibar–Inhambane coastal forest mosaic, also known as the Northern Swahili coastal forests and woodlands, is a tropical moist broadleaf forest ecoregion of coastal East Africa. The ecoregion includes a variety of habitats, including forest, savanna and swamps.

== Geography ==
The ecoregion extends along the East African coast from southern Somalia through Kenya to the Lukuledi River in Tanzania, which forms its southern boundary. It also encompasses the Zanzibar Archipelago, including Unguja (Zanzibar), Pemba, and the surrounding smaller islands.

The ecoregion is bounded on the east by the Indian Ocean. It transitions to drier open woodlands and shrublands to the north and west: the Somali Acacia–Commiphora bushlands and thickets in the north, the Northern Acacia–Commiphora bushlands and thickets and Southern Acacia–Commiphora bushlands and thickets west of the central portion, and the Eastern miombo woodlands to the southwest. To the south, it borders the Southern Zanzibar–Inhambane coastal forest mosaic across the Lukuledi River.

== Flora ==
The coastal forest mosaic is made up of several different forest and woodland types, including:

- Zanzibar–Inhambane lowland rain forest. Lowland rain forest occurs on the lower slopes of the Uluguru, Nguru, and Usambara mountains, and in parts of Tanzania's Ulanga and Iringa districts. These forests have a canopy of evergreen trees up to 20 meters high, with emergent trees growing up to 40 meters high. Characteristic canopy and emergent tree species include Aningeria pseudoracemosa, Antiaris toxicaria, Nauclea nyasica, Milicia excelsa, Khaya nyasica, Lovoa swynnertonii, Maranthes goetzeniana, Newtonia buchananii, Parkia filicoidea, Ricinodendron heudelotii, Sterculia appendiculata, and Terminalia sambesiaca.
- Zanzibar–Inhambane transitional rain forest is a mid-elevation rain forest which includes both lowland species and Afromontane species. It is found on the eastern, seaward-facing slopes of the Usambara, Nguru, Uluguru, and Udzungwa mountains of Tanzania and the Shimba Hills of Kenya, generally above 800 meters elevation and sometimes at lower elevations in stream valleys. Up to 40% of the large woody species are endemic to the transition forest, interspersed with characteristic Guineo–Congolian and Afromontane species. Some characteristic trees include Macaranga capensis, Maranthes goetzeniana, Morinda asteroscepa, Newtonia buchananii, Strychnos mitis, and Trichilia dregeana. Cephalosphaera usambarensis and Englerodendron usambarense, which are the sole species in their genera, are endemic to the transition rain forest. The Amani Nature Reserve in the East Usambaras preserves an enclave of transition rain forest.
- Zanzibar–Inhambane undifferentiated forest is found throughout the ecoregion. Many canopy trees are briefly deciduous, although not all concurrently. Lianas are abundant, while epiphytes are relatively few and inconspicuous. Moister undifferentiated forests are found in Kenya and northern Tanzania. Drier undifferentiated forests cover a larger area and extend further north and south. Some species are confined either to the wetter or drier forests, while others occur throughout. In moister areas the main tree canopy is 15 to 20 meters high, with emergent trees growing above the canopy to 30 or 35 meters in height. Typical canopy and emergent trees of the wetter forests include Afzelia quanzensis (20 m), Albizia adianthifolia (25 m), Antiaris toxicaria (35 m), Apodytes dimidiata, Balanites wilsoniana (30 m), Trilepisium madagascariense (20 m), Celtis wightii (20 m), Combretum schumannii (25 m), Cordyla africana (25 m), Chlorophora excelsa (35 m), Diospyros mespiliformis (30 m), Erythrina sacleuxii (20 m), Erythrophleum suaveolens (25 m), Fernandoa magnifica (20 m), Ficus vallis-choudae (20 m), Inhambanella henriquesii (25 m), Julbernardia magnistipulata (30 m), Lannea welwitschii (25 m), Lovoa swynnertonii (35 m), Macaranga capensis (25 m), Malacantha alnifolia (20 m), Manilkara sansibarensis (25 m), Mimusops aedificatoria (25 m), Newtonia paucijuga (25 m), Nesogordonia parvifolia (20 m), Paramacrolobium coeruleum (25 m), Parkia filicoidea (30 m), Pachystela brevipes (25 m), Rhodognaphalon schumannianum (30 m), Ricinodendron heudelotii (35 m), Sterculia appendiculata (35 m), Terminalia sambesiaca (35 m), Hymenaea verrucosa (30 m), and Xylopia parviflora (25 m). In the drier forests some emergent and canopy tree species may be dominant or co-dominant, while others have a mixed canopy. Common drier forest species include Vachellia robusta subsp. usambarensis (20 m), Afzelia quanzensis (15 m), Albizia petersiana (15 m), Balanites wilsoniana, Trilepisium madagascariense (15 m), Brachylaena huillensis (15 m), Cassipourea euryoides (15 m), Combretum schumannii (15 m), Cussonia zimmermannii (15 m), Cynometra webberi (12 m), Julbernardia magnistipulata (10-15 m), Manilkara sansibarensis (18 m), Manilkara sulcata (10 m), Memecylon sansibaricum (9 m), Newtonia paucijuga (15 m), Oldfieldia somalensis (12 m), Pleurostylia africana (15 m), Scorodophloeus fischeri (15 m), Tamarindus indica (12 m), and Hymenaea verrucosa (18 m).
- Zanzibar–Inhambane scrub forest is a transitional plant community, found in southern Somalia, Kenya, and northern Tanzania at edges of the semi-arid interior Acacia–Commiphora bushlands, with average annual rainfall between 500 and 750 mm. Diospyros cornii is the predominant tree, forming a discontinuous canopy 9 to 15 meters high. Manilkara mochisia is also common.
- Zanzibar–Inhambane scrub forest on coral rag grows on shallow, fast-draining soils over coralline limestone in areas with 950 to 1200 mm of average annual rainfall. They are thickets of evergreen trees and large shrubs, with an uneven canopy 6 to 10 meters high, with occasional emergent trees growing 8 to 15 meters high.
- Zanzibar–Inhambane transition woodland is a type of miombo woodland. Brachystegia spiciformis is the predominant tree species.

About 3000 plant species are native to the Zanzibar–Inhambane region. Several hundred are endemic.

190 forest tree species are recorded in the region, of which 92 are endemic. 25% of forest species are shared with the Guineo-Congolian region of central and western Africa, 15.3% with the subtropical Maputaland coastal forest mosaic to the south, 4.7% with Madagascar, and 3.7% with the highland Afromontane region. Endemic genera include the monotypic Brochoneura and Grandidiera. The genera Ludia, Stuhlmannia, and Bivinia are native to the Zanzibar–Inhambane forests and to Madagascar. The genera Hirtella and Hymenaea are native to the Zanzibar-Inhambane region and to the tropical Americas, and are not found elsewhere in Africa.

== Fauna ==
The ecoregion is home to ten endemic species of birds. Four are restricted to the island of Pemba – the Pemba green pigeon (Treron pembaensis), Pemba sunbird (Cinnyris pembae), Pemba white-eye (Zosterops vaughani), and Pemba scops owl (Otus pembaensis). The remaining six are found on the mainland. The Tana River cisticola (Cisticola restrictus) is found in the lower Tana River of Kenya. Four endemic species are found in mainland coastal forest remnants – the little yellow flycatcher (Erythrocercus holochlorus), Sokoke pipit (Anthus sokokensis), Clarke's weaver (Ploceus golandi), and Mombasa woodpecker (Campethera mombassica). The Malindi pipit (Anthus melindae) is endemic to the coastal grasslands in Kenya. The ecoregion corresponds to the East African coastal forests endemic bird area.

== Protected areas ==
18.4% of the ecoregion is in protected areas. The VECEA team estimated that 7.9% of the 88,640 km^{2} of coastal mosaic in Kenya and Tanzania is within protected areas explicitly designated for biodiversity, species, or landscape protection (IUCN protected area categories I through IV), and 14.8% is in areas designated for both protection and sustainable human use (IUCN protected area categories V and VI).

Protected areas within the ecoregion include Arabuko Sokoke Forest Reserve and National Park, Arawale National Reserve, Boni National Reserve, Dodori National Reserve, and Shimba Hills National Reserve in Kenya, and Jozani-Chwaka Bay National Park, Saadani National Park, Mafia Island Marine Park, part of Udzungwa Mountains National Park, and the eastern portion of Selous Game Reserve in Tanzania.
