= Mikumi National Park =

National park of Tanzania

- Hifadhi ya Taifa ya Mikumi
- IUCN category II (national park)
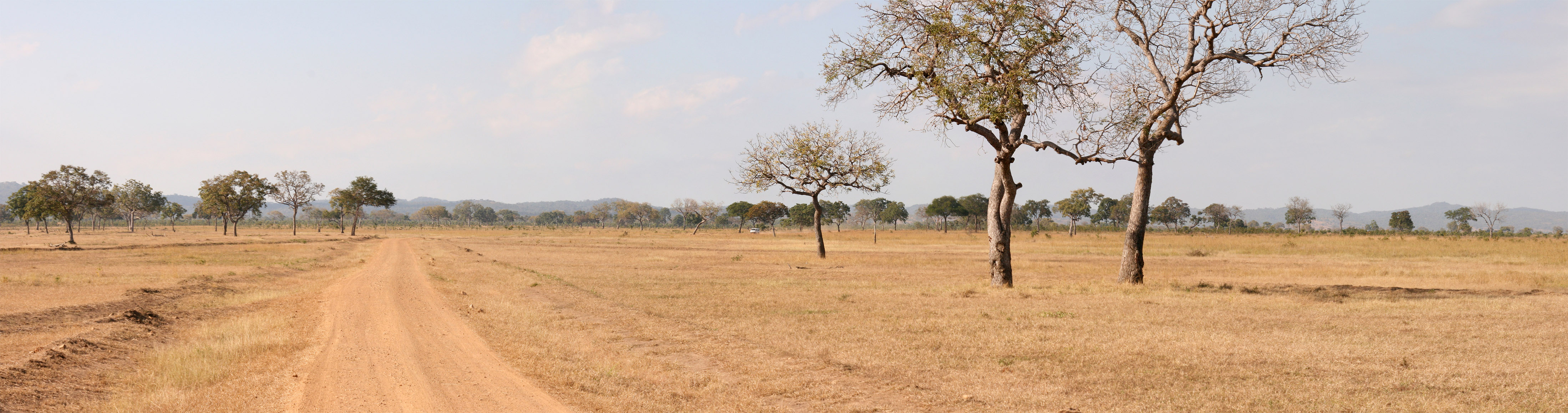
- Mikumi National Park scene

- Location within Tanzania
- Location: Mikumi near Morogoro, Tanzania
- Nearest city: Dar es Salaam
- Coordinates: 7°21′S 37°9′E
- Area: 3,230 km (2,010 mi)
- Established: 1964
- Visitors: 41,666 (in 2012)
- Governing body: Mikumi National Park
- Website: www.tanzaniaparks.go.tz/national_parks/mikumi-national-park

Mikumi National Park is a national park in Tanzania located near the city of Morogoro, with an area of 3,230 km^{2} (1,250 sq mi) that was established in 1964. It is the fourth largest in the country.

== Territory ==
Mikumi National Park borders Selous Game Reserve on the south, the two areas forming a unique ecosystem. Two other natural areas bordering the national park are the Udzungwa Mountains and Uluguru Mountains. Malundwe Mountain is within the park, the highest of a belt of hills that run east and west through the park, connecting the Uluguru Mountains to the northeast with the Uvidunda and Udzungwa mountains to the west. Malundwe Mountain consists of three peaks along a ridge running north and south. Malundwe's south peak is the highest point in the park, reaching 1290 meters elevation.

== Flora and fauna ==
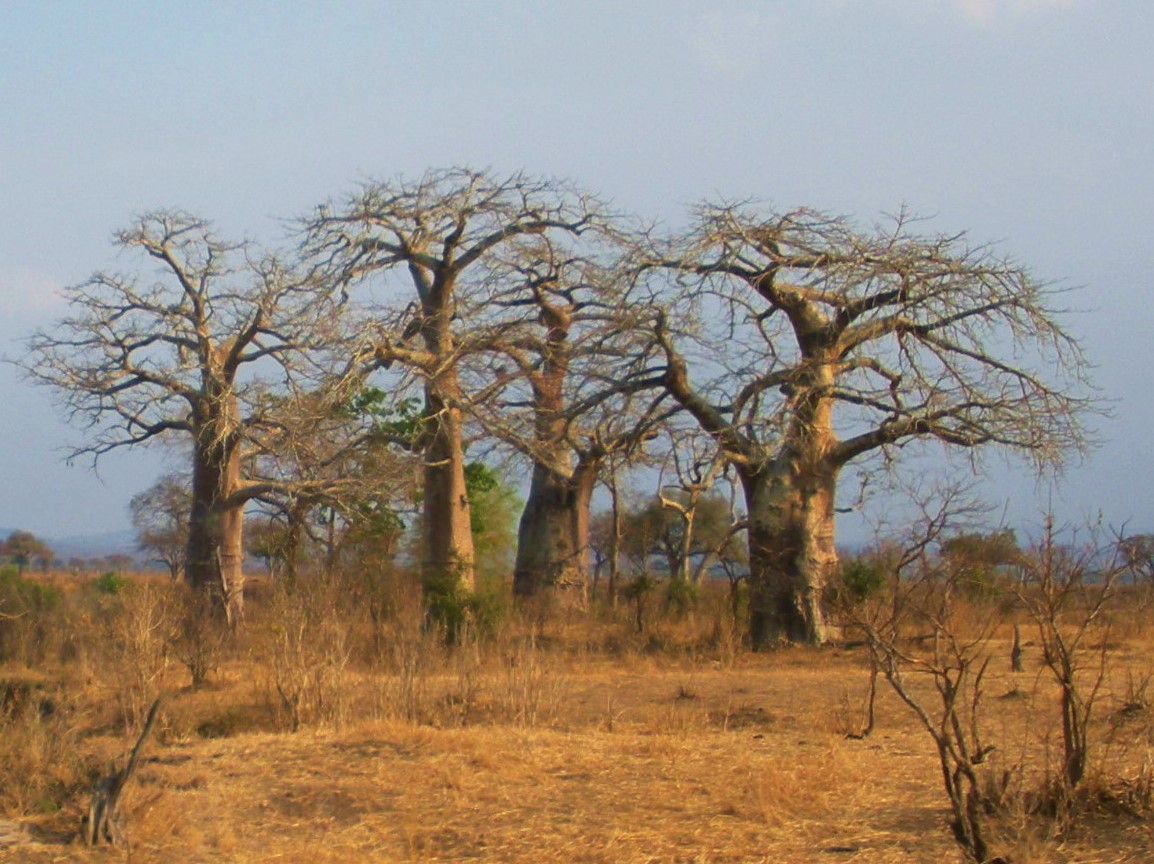
A group of baobab trees in Mikumi National Park

The landscape of Mikumi is often compared to that of the Serengeti. The road that crosses the park divides it into two areas with partially distinct environments. The area north-west is characterized by the alluvial plain of the river basin Mkata. The vegetation of this area consists of savannah dotted with acacia, baobab, tamarinds, and some palm trees. In this area, at the furthest from the road, there are spectacular rock formations of the mountains Rubeho and Uluguru. The southeast part of the park is less rich in wildlife, and not very accessible.

The fauna includes many species characteristic of the African savannah. The park contains a subspecies of giraffe that biologists consider the link between the Masai giraffe and the reticulated giraffe. Other animals in the park are African bush elephant, zebras, impala, common eland, kudu, black antelope, baboon, wildebeest and African buffalo. Approximately 5 km north of the park, there are two artificial pools inhabited by hippopotamus. More than 400 different species of birds also inhabit the park.
