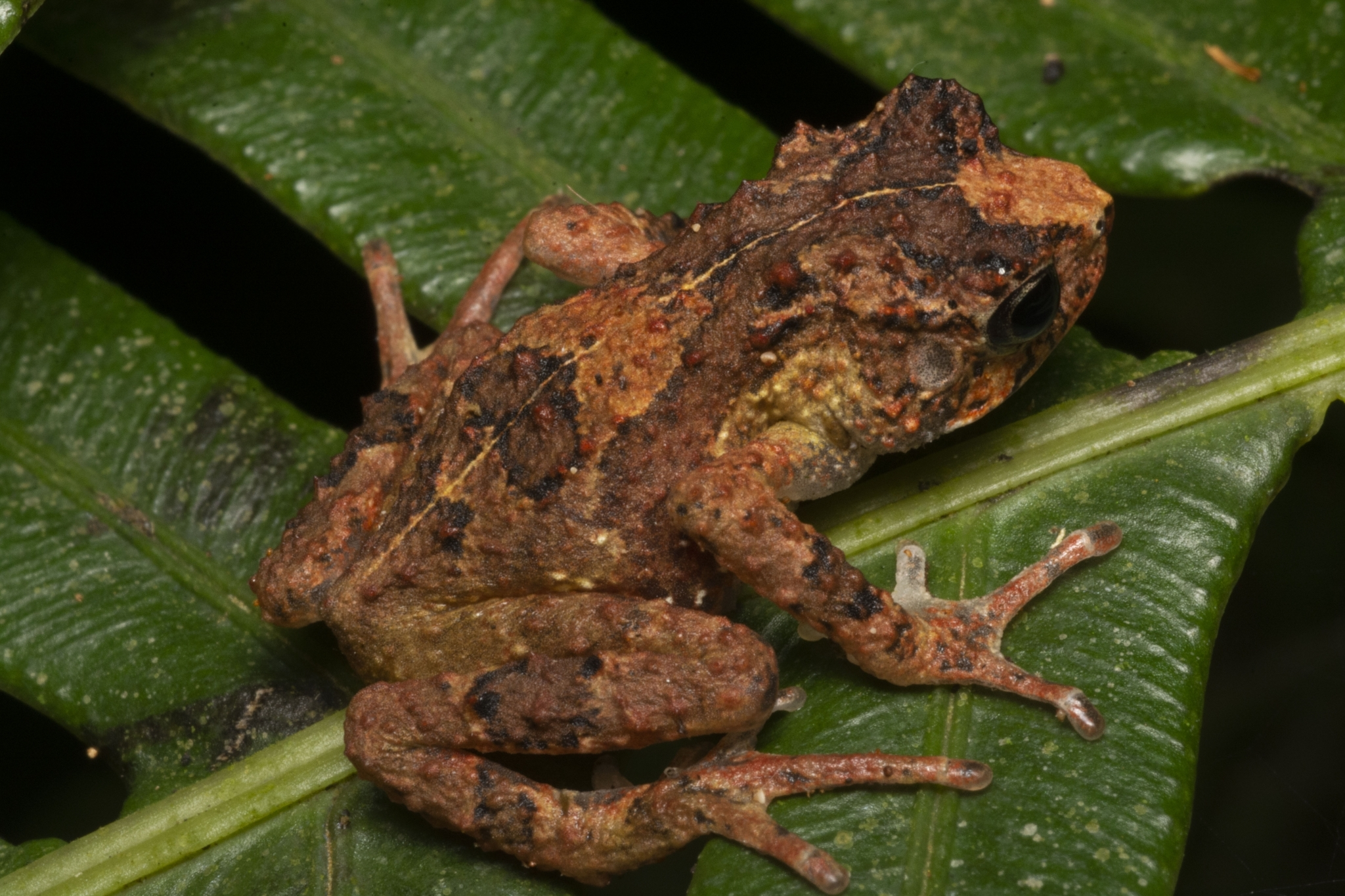

Conservation status
- Critically Endangered (IUCN 3.1)
- CITES Appendix I

Scientific classification
- Kingdom: Animalia
- Phylum: Chordata
- Class: Amphibia
- Order: Anura
- Family: Bufonidae
- Genus: Nectophrynoides
- Species: N. paulae

Binomial name
- Nectophrynoides paulae Menegon, Salvavidio, Ngalason & Loader, 2007

= Nectophrynoides paulae =

Species of amphibian

Nectophrynoides paulae is a species of toad in the family Bufonidae. It is endemic to the Ukaguru Mountains of Tanzania.
