= Rubeho Mountains =

Mountain range in Tanzania

- Location within Tanzania

Highest point
- Peak: Mangalisa
- Elevation: 2,286 m (7,500 ft)

Geography
- Country: Tanzania
- Range coordinates: 07°01′S 36°42′E
- Parent range: Eastern Arc Mountains
- Borders on: Ukaguru Mountains

The Rubeho Mountains are a mountain range in central Tanzania. The mountains in Dodoma and Morogoro regions, southeast of Tanzania's capital Dodoma. The Rubeho Mountains are part of the Eastern Arc Mountains, and are home to a biodiverse community of flora and fauna with large numbers of endemic species.

== Geography ==
The Rubeho Mountains are a dissected plateau, covering an area of 4636 km^{2}. The highest peaks in the range are Mangalisa (2,286 m), Mafwemiro (2,152 m) and Ledengombe (1,941 m). On the south, the steep-sided valley of the Great Ruaha River separates the Rubheho Mountains from the Udzungwa Mountains. On the southeast a narrow gap separates the Rubeho Mountains from Uvidunda Mountains. The Pala Mountains are close to the east, and the Mkata Plain beyond them. The Mkondoa River separates the Rubeho Mountains from the Ukaguru Mountains on the north and northeast. The Wota Mountains, a western outlier of the Rubeho mountains, and East African Plateau lie to the west.

== Climate ==
The Rubeho Mountains intercept moisture-laden winds from the Indian Ocean, and receive more rainfall than the surrounding lowlands. Most of the rainfall occurs in the November-to-May wet season, although mist and light rain occur at higher elevations during the dry season months. Rainfall is higher on the southern and eastern slopes facing the Indian Ocean, and lower in the mountains' rain shadow to the north and west. Temperatures are cooler at higher elevations.

== Geology ==
The Rubeho Mountains, along with the others in the Eastern Arc, are made up of ancient crystalline Precambrian rocks that were uplifted over millions of years along fault lines. The most recent period of uplift started 30 million years ago, but the fault system and uplift process may be far older. Soils derived from these ancient rocks are not as fertile as the younger volcanic soils of mountains to the north and west.

== Flora and fauna ==
About thirty million years ago, the area was covered by extensive rainforest. During a cooler and drier period some ten million years ago, the lowland forests were converted to savanna, leaving the mountain ranges as "islands" where the tropical forests continued to flourish. The long-term persistence of a humid climate and the isolation of each mountain range has led to a great deal of endemism, and a very diverse flora and fauna. The Rubeho and other Eastern Arc mountains have extremely high biodiversity with numerous endemic species (more than 25 percent of the vertebrate species).

The Rubeho Mountains are covered with miombo woodland, dry montane forest, montane grassland, montane rainforest, and Acacia-Commiphora bushlands and thickets. Forests extend from 520 to 2050 meters elevation, and vary in composition and species type with elevation and rainfall. An analysis of satellite images taken between 1999 and 2003 found 464 km^{2} of the mountains were still covered in evergreen forest.

The wetter eastern and southeastern slopes receive more rain from the Indian Ocean and support miombo woodlands at lower elevations, transitional evergreen forests above 520 meters elevation, and montane evergreen forests at higher elevations. Tree species in the montane evergreen forests include Agarista salicifolia, Aphloia theiformis, Bridelia micrantha, Catha edulis, Diospyros whyteana, Halleria lucida, Macaranga kilimandscharica, Maesa lanceolata, Maytenus acuminata, Nuxia congesta, Parinari excelsa, Polyscias fulva, Rapanea melanophloeos, and Xymalos monospora. On the western slopes of the main plateau, Macaranga kilimandscharica is the predominant tree, forming a 10-15-meter canopy in dry montane forests in valleys at 1,600–1,700 meters elevation.

The drier western and northwestern slopes have Acacia-Commiphora bushlands and thickets at lower elevations, and dry montane forests at higher elevations.

The Rubeho warbler (Scepomycter rubehoensis) is a highland songbird endemic to the Rubeho and Uvidunda mountains. Other endemic or near-endemic birds are the Rubeho forest partridge (Xenoperdix obscuratus) and Rubeho akalat (Sheppardia aurantiithorax).

Elephants (Loxodonta africana) and Red forest duikers (Cephalophus natalensis) are found in the forests of the eastern plateau.

== Protected areas and conservation ==
Ukwiva Forest Reserve (54,635 hectares), Mafwemiro Forest Reserve [3,238 hectares], and Mangalisa Forest Reserve [4,988 hectares] are among the protected areas. Ukwiva covers the northeastern portion of the main plateau, and includes the mountains' largest block of evergreen montane forest on the eastern slopes, and dry montane forest at 1,600–1,700 m. Pala Mountain Forest Reserve (108.34 km^{2}) includes the transitional evergreen forests in the Pala Mountains, just east of the main plateau. Mafwemiro is northwest of Ukivwa. Mangalisa is a separate mountain block west of the main plateau, north of the Great Ruaha River. Mangalisa forest reserve includes patches of disturbed dry high-elevation semi-evergreen woodland, and Podocarpus-dominated montane forest in the southern part of the reserve.

== Transport ==
The highway number A7 in Tanzania borders the southern edge of the highlands, following the Big Ruaha River before heading northeast through the Rubeho-Uvidunda mountain gap.. Tanzania Central Line railway skirts the northern end of the mountains, following the Mkondoa River between the Rubeho and the Ukaguru mountains between Dar es Salaam and western Tanzania. At Kilosa the Central Railway's Mikumi line branches south through the Mkata Plain east of the mountains.
