= Mertensophryne loveridgei =

Conservation status
- Least Concern (IUCN 3.1)

Scientific classification
- Kingdom: Animalia
- Phylum: Chordata
- Class: Amphibia
- Order: Anura
- Family: Bufonidae
- Genus: Mertensophryne
- Species: M. loveridgei

Binomial name
- Mertensophryne loveridgei (Poynton, 1991)

Synonyms
- Stephopaedes loveridgei Poynton, 1991

Species of amphibian

The Mahenge toad or Loveridge's forest toad (Mertensophryne loveridgei) is a species of toad in the family Bufonidae. It is endemic to Tanzania; its common name refers to the Mahenge Plateau where it can be found. Its natural habitats are tropical forests and woodlands. It is not considered threatened by the IUCN.
