= Mikumi =

- Town
- Location within Tanzania
- Coordinates: 07°24′26″S 36°58′20″E
- Country: Tanzania
- Region: Morogoro Region
- Elevation: 515 m (1,690 ft)

Population (2022 census)
  - Total: 20,000
- Time zone: UTC+3 (EAT)
- Climate: Aw

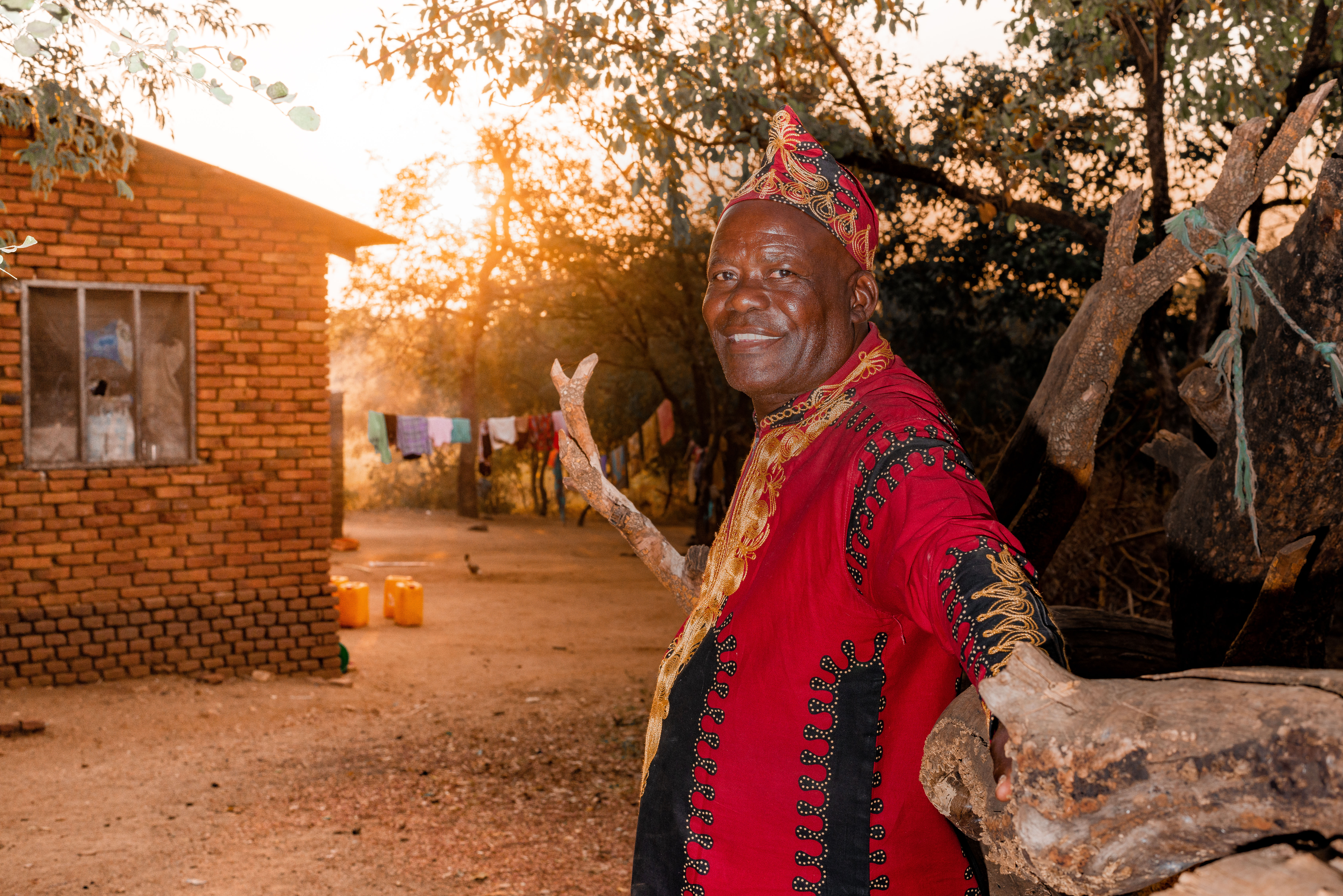
A man and his home in Mikumi

Mikumi is a town in the Morogoro Region of Tanzania, adjacent to Mikumi National Park. It is at the crossroads to the Great Ruaha River valley and Kilombero sugar factory, and the southern highland regions of Iringa and Mbeya. It is near the larger town of Kidodi. Kidodi is near a railway station and junction of the Tanzania Railway Corporation.

== See also ==
- Transport in Tanzania
- Railway stations in Tanzania
- Mikumi National Park
