= Mahenge Mountains =

Mountains in Morogoro Region, Tanzania

Coordinates: 8°41′S 36°43′E

Dimensions
- Area: 2,802.29 km^{2} (1,081.97 sq mi)

Geography
- Location: Ulanga District, Morogoro Region, Tanzania

The Mahenge Mountains are a mountain range in Ulanga District, Morogoro Region, Tanzania. The town of Mahenge is located in the northeastern mountains. The mountains are southeast of Iringa, in the Eastern miombo woodlands ecoregion.

== Geography ==
The Mahenge Mountains cover an area of 2802.29 km^{2}. The Mahenge mountains are an outlier of the Eastern Arc Mountains. The Kilombero Plain lies to the north and west, and separate the Mahenge Mountains from the Udzungwa Mountains. Selous Game Reserve lies to the east. The Mbarika Mountains lie to the south and southwest.

== Geology ==
The mountains are made up of proterozoic rocks, including schist and marble, of the Mozambique Belt.

Spinels are mined from the Ipanko deposit. Australia's Black Rock Mining corporation is developing open-pit graphite mines in the mountains.

== Climate ==
The dry season is June to October.

== People ==
The major economic activities of the Mahenge population is agriculture. The major crops include maize, rice, and beans.

Mahenge is the principal town in the mountains. There is a hospital, a market, and primary schools. A Catholic Capuchin mission was established around 1897, and there is now a St. Francis Kasita Seminary at Mahenge. The Diocese of Mahenge was established in 1964. About 60 percent of the population are Catholic Christians.

== Ecology ==
The Mahenge Mountains are covered with evergreen forest, miombo woodland, grassland, and heathland. Forests extend from 460–1040 meters elevation, and vary in composition and species type with elevation and rainfall. The lower elevations of the mountains and surrounding plains are covered in deciduous miombo forests and woodlands.

An analysis of satellite images taken between 1999 and 2003 found 19 km^{2} of the mountains were still covered in evergreen forest.

Water is generally scarce due to the limestone plateau, but despite this the area gives its name to the Mahenge Toad (Mertensophryne loveridgei). The rare tree Dombeya amaniensis is also found in this region.

The Mahenge Scarp Catchment Forest Reserve, established in 1954, is 3.87 km^{2} in area and begins 8 km west of Mahenge town. This forest has been heavily encroached upon for illegal logging.

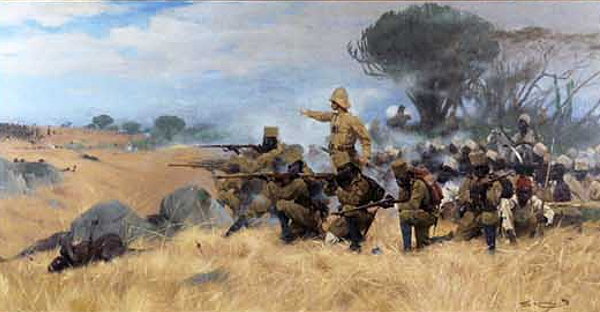
Battle at Mahenge by Wilhelm Kuhnert, German East Africa, 1905.

Sali Forest Reserve, established in 1954, preserves 1890 ha between 1050 and 1500 meters elevation. The forest reserve includes montane and submontane evergreen forests, along with wetlands, dry grasslands, and rocky outcrops. Mselezi forest reserve, also established in 1954, preserves 2245 ha between 500 and 900 meters elevation, and includes riverine lowland forest and semi-evergreen lowland forest.

== History ==
In slaving times, the Mahenge area was notorious as the home of slave hunters.
