= Udzungwa Mountains National Park =

National Park of Tanzania

- Hifadhi ya Taifa ya Milima ya Udzungwa
- IUCN category II (national park)
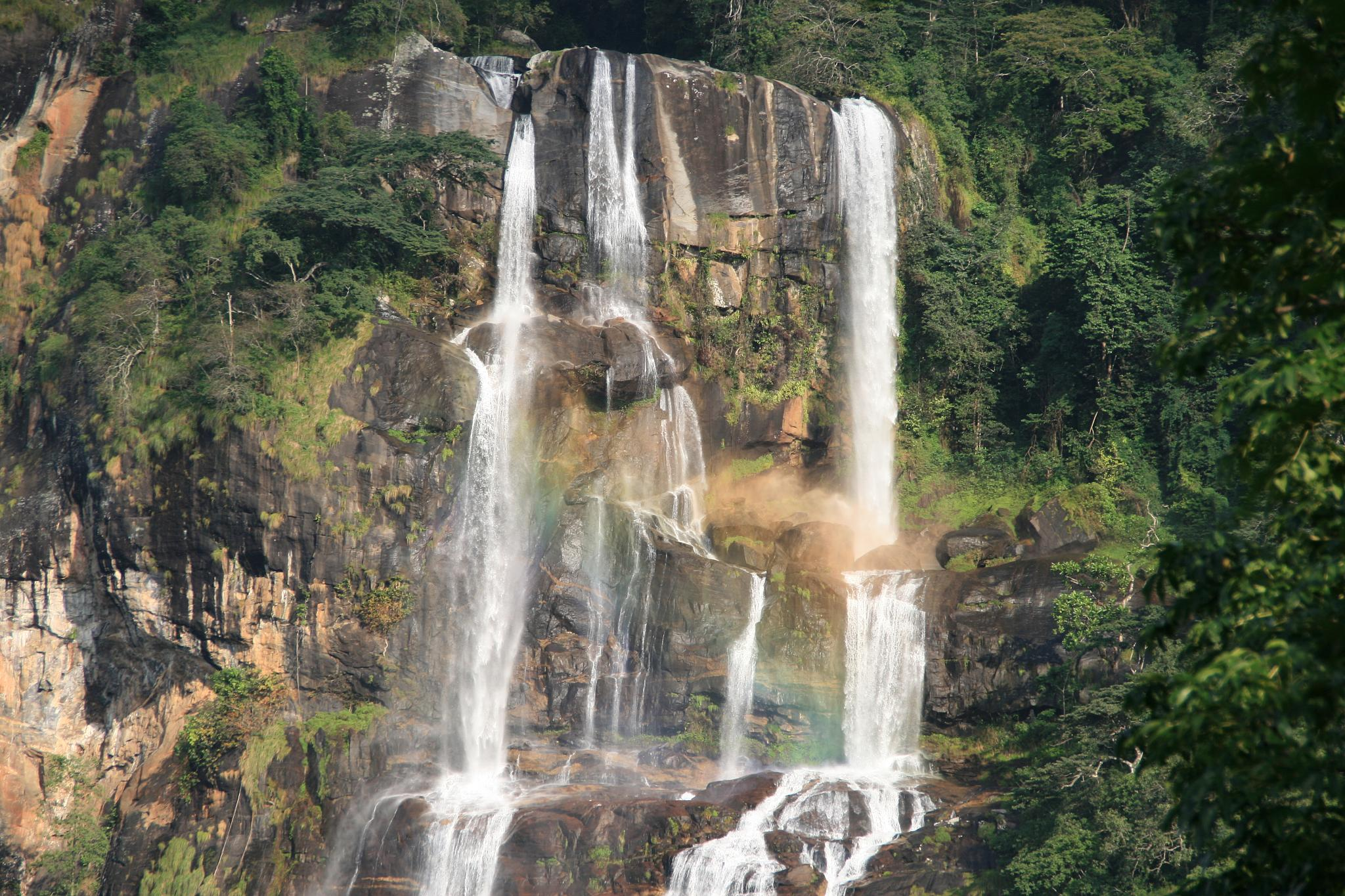
- Waterfalls in Udzungwa Mountains National Park

- Location within Tanzania
- Location: Kilolo District of Iringa Region & Kilombero District of Morogoro Region; Tanzania
- Nearest city: Morogoro
- Coordinates: 7°48′0″S 36°41′0″E
- Area: 1,990 km^{2} (770 mi^{2})
- Designation: National Park
- Established: 2012
- Named for: Udzungwa Mountains
- Governing body: Tanzania National Parks Authority under the Ministry of Natural Resources and Tourism
- Website: Official Page

The Udzungwa Mountains National Park is a national park in Tanzania's Kilolo District of Iringa Region and Kilombero District of Morogoro Region. It has a size of 1,990 km^{2} (770 sq mi). The habitats contained within the national park include tropical rainforest, mountain forest, miombo woodland, grassland and steppe. There is a vertical height range of 250–2,576 metres (the peak of Lohomero), which incorporates the Udzungwa Mountains part of the Eastern Arc Mountains. There are more than 400 bird species, 2,500 plant species (25% of which are endemics) and 6 primate species. It has the second largest biodiversity of a national park in Africa.

== Endemism ==
Six primate species have been recorded in the park, five of which are endemic. The Udzungwa red colobus and Sanje crested mangabey are only found in the Udzungwa Mountains National Park, the mangabey species was undetected by biologists prior to 1979. A new endemic species of chameleon was discovered in 2009 in the national park.
