= Ukaguru Mountains =

Mountain range in Morogoro Region of Tanzania

- Milima ya Ukaguru (Swahili)

Highest point
- Elevation: 2,264 m (7,428 ft)

Geography
- Country: Tanzania
- Region: Morogoro Region
- District: Kilosa District
- Range coordinates: 06°28′S 37°00′E
- Parent range: Eastern Arc Mountains

The Ukaguru Mountains (Milima ya Ukaguru in Swahili) are a mountain range in eastern Tanzania. The mountains are administratively located in the Morogoro Region, specifically in the Kilosa District. The mountains are named for the Kaguru people. The Ukaguru Mountains are part of the Eastern Arc Mountains, and are home to a biodiverse community of flora and fauna with large numbers of endemic species.

== Geography ==
The Ukaguru Mountains are plateau, covering an area of 1258.8 km^{2}. The Mkondoa River separates the Ukaguru Mountains from the Rubeho Mountains to the southwest. The Mkata Plain lies to the east. The Nguru Mountains lie to the northeast. The Kiboriani Mountains, a western outlier of the Ukagurus, and East African Plateau lie to the west.

== Climate ==
The Ukaguru Mountains lie in the rain shadow of the taller Uluguru Mountains to the southeast, which block the moisture-laden winds from the Indian Ocean which provide most of the rainfall in the Eastern Arc Mountains. Most of the rainfall occurs in the November-to-May wet season, although mist and light rain occur at higher elevations during the dry season months. Rainfall is higher on the southern and eastern slopes, and lower in the mountains' rain shadow to the north and west. Temperatures are cooler and rainfall is higher at higher elevations.

== Geology ==
The Ukaguru Mountains, along with the others in the Eastern Arc, are made up of ancient crystalline Precambrian rocks that were uplifted over millions of years along fault lines. The most recent period of uplift started 30 million years ago, but the fault system and uplift process may be far older. Soils derived from these ancient rocks are not as fertile as the younger volcanic soils of mountains to the north and west.

== Flora and fauna ==
About thirty million years ago, the area was covered by extensive rainforest. During a cooler and drier period some ten million years ago, the lowland forests were converted to savanna, leaving the mountain ranges as "islands" where the tropical forests continued to flourish. The long-term persistence of a humid climate and the isolation of each mountain range has led to a great deal of endemism, and a very diverse flora and fauna. The Ukaguru and other Eastern Arc mountains have extremely high biodiversity with numerous endemic species (more than 25 percent of the vertebrate species).

The Ukaguru Mountains are covered with miombo woodland on the eastern and southern slopes, Acacia-Commiphora woodland and savanna on the northern and western slopes, and montane rainforest, dry montane forest, montane grassland at higher elevations. Forests extend from 1500 to 2250 meters elevation. An analysis of satellite images taken between 1999 and 2003 found 172 km^{2} of the mountains were still covered in evergreen forest.

Tree species in the montane evergreen forests include Balthasaria schliebenii, Ocotea usambarensis, Podocarpus milanjianus, and Polyscias stuhlmannii. The forests are less diverse, and have a lower canopy, than montane forest in the other Eastern Arc mountains. Large areas of degraded montane grassland lie west of the main ridgeline.

The toads Nectophrynoides laticeps and N. paulae are endemic to the Ukaguru mountains. The plants Peddiea thulinii and Lobelia sancta are endemic to the Ukagurus.

== Protected areas and conservation ==
The Ikwamba (889 ha), Mamboto (149 ha), Mamiwa-Kisara North (7,897 ha), Mamiwa-Kisara South (6,266 ha) and Uponera (293 ha) forest reserves preserve areas of montane forest. Two smaller forest reserves are dominated by exotic pine plantations.

== Transport ==
Tanzania Central Line railway between Dar es Salaam and western Tanzania passes the southern end of the mountains, following the Mkondoa River between the Ukaguru and Rubeho mountains. Tanzania's B127 highway runs along the eastern base of the mountains, and the B129 highway, which connects Morogoro and Dodoma, runs north of the range between the Ukaguru and Nguru mountains.
