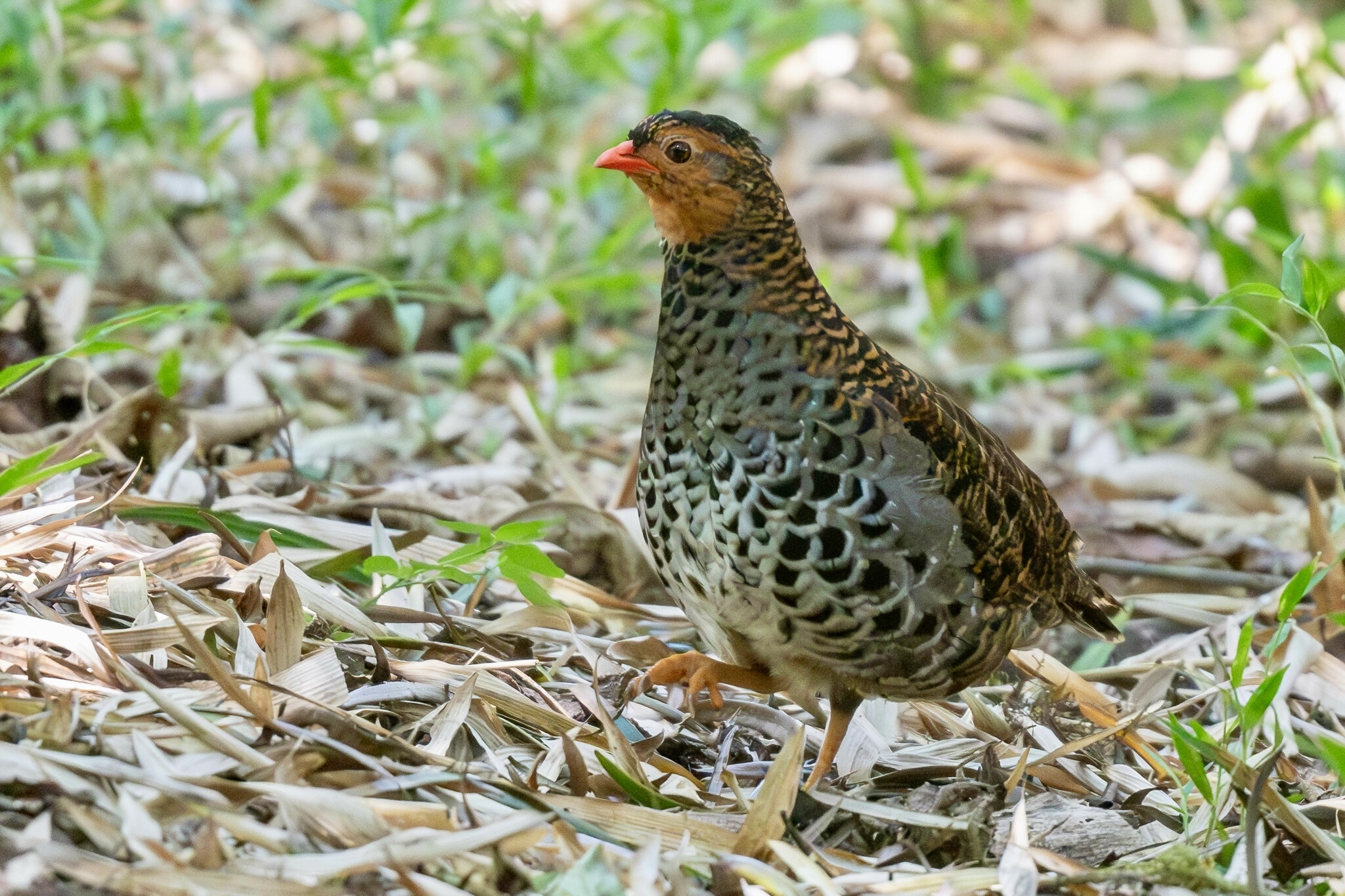

Conservation status
- Endangered (IUCN 3.1)

Scientific classification
- Kingdom: Animalia
- Phylum: Chordata
- Class: Aves
- Order: Galliformes
- Family: Phasianidae
- Genus: Xenoperdix; Dinesen, Lehmberg, Svendsen, Hansen & Fjeldså, 1994
- Species: X. udzungwensis

Binomial name
- Xenoperdix udzungwensis Dinesen, Lehmberg, Svendsen, Hansen & Fjeldså, 1994
- X. u. obscurata X. u. udzungwensis

= Udzungwa forest partridge =

Species of bird

The Udzungwa forest partridge (Xenoperdix udzungwensis), also known as the Udzungwa partridge, is a small, approximately 29 centimetres (11 in) long, boldly barred, brownish partridge with rufous face, grey underparts, olive-brown crown and upperparts. It has a red bill, brown iris and yellow legs. The sexes are similar.

== Taxonomy ==
The Udzungwa forest partridge was formally described by Lars Dinesen and colleagues in 1994 based on a specimen collected in the Udzungwa Mountains of southern Tanzania. They introduced a new genus Xenoperdix, and coined the binomial name Xenoperdix udzungwensis.

Two subspecies are recognised:

- X. u. udzungwensis Dinesen, Lehmberg, Svendsen & Hansen & Fjeldså, 1994 – Udzungwa Mountains of Tanzania
- X. u. obscuratus Fjeldså & Kiure, 2003 – Rubeho highlands of Tanzania

The subspecies X. u. obscuratus has sometimes been considered as a separate species, the Rubeho forest partridge.

== Description ==
=== Vocalisations ===
The advertisement call is a short series of loud notes that can be heard up to 100 m away. It is usually given in the morning. The partridge's contact calls include soft clucks and high-pitches peeping notes, often given when anxious.

== Distribution and habitat ==
The Udzungwa forest partridge is endemic to eastern Tanzania, where it is two disjunct populations in the Udzungwa and Rubeho mountain ranges. The nominate subspecies is found in the Udzungwa Mountains, where it is inhabits the Ndundulu-Luhombero Forest and Nyumbanitu Forest. In Ndundulu-Luhombero Forest, the partridges occurs at elevations of 1,350–2,060 m. Nyumbanitu Forest is separated from Ndundulu-Luhombero by 5 km of grassland habitat. The Udzungwa forest partridge was formerly known from this forest at elevations of 1,500–1,700 m, but has not been recorded here since 2012. A 2018 survey that involved the use of widespread playback failed to locate the species at Nyumbanitu, suggesting that the species has been extirpated from the area. The subspecies obscuratus is known only from Chugu Hill, in the northern Mafwemiro Forest in the Rubeho Mountains. It occurs at elevations of 1,700–1,900 m.

The partridge inhabits montane evergreen forest with closed or semi-closed canopies. It prefers forests with open understoreys, leaf litter, and Cyperus sedges, but does not have a strong preference for any specific microhabitat. In the Ndundulu-Luhombero Forest, its abundance is not affected by slope or the proximity of villages.

== Behaviour and ecology ==
The Udzungwa forest partridge is a fairly confiding species, coming as close as 3 m to human observers while foraging. However, they are fairly elusive and hard to see, with days of fieldwork typically only leading to a few sightings of the species. It typically runs away when approached, only resorting to flying when startled and dropping back to ground within less than 10 m after flushing. They form flocks of up to eight birds, with an average flock size of around three birds. Flocks tend to be smaller during the breeding season, when more birds are part of breeding pairs. Roosting takes place on branches in trees.

Udzungwa forest partridges are known to feed on beetles, ants, flies, insect larvae, woodlice, and seeds. Foraging takes place in small flocks that travel slowly through the forest floor. The partridges pick up and throw away dead leaves to find seeds and prey. They also catch insects by snapping at leaves. Foraging sometimes takes place near trails at dusk.

Breeding in the species is poorly known and its nest has never been observed. Females with brood patches have been observed in January. Chicks have been seen from November to January, sugegsting that the breeding season starts with the rainy season. Adults have only been seen with one or two chicks, suggesting that the Udzungwa forest partridge has much lower brood sizes than other partridges.

== Status ==
Due to ongoing habitat loss, small population size, limited range and overhunting in some areas, the Udzungwa forest partridge is classified as Endangered on the IUCN Red List of Threatened Species.
