= Southern Acacia–Commiphora bushlands and thickets =

Ecoregion in Kenya and Tanzania

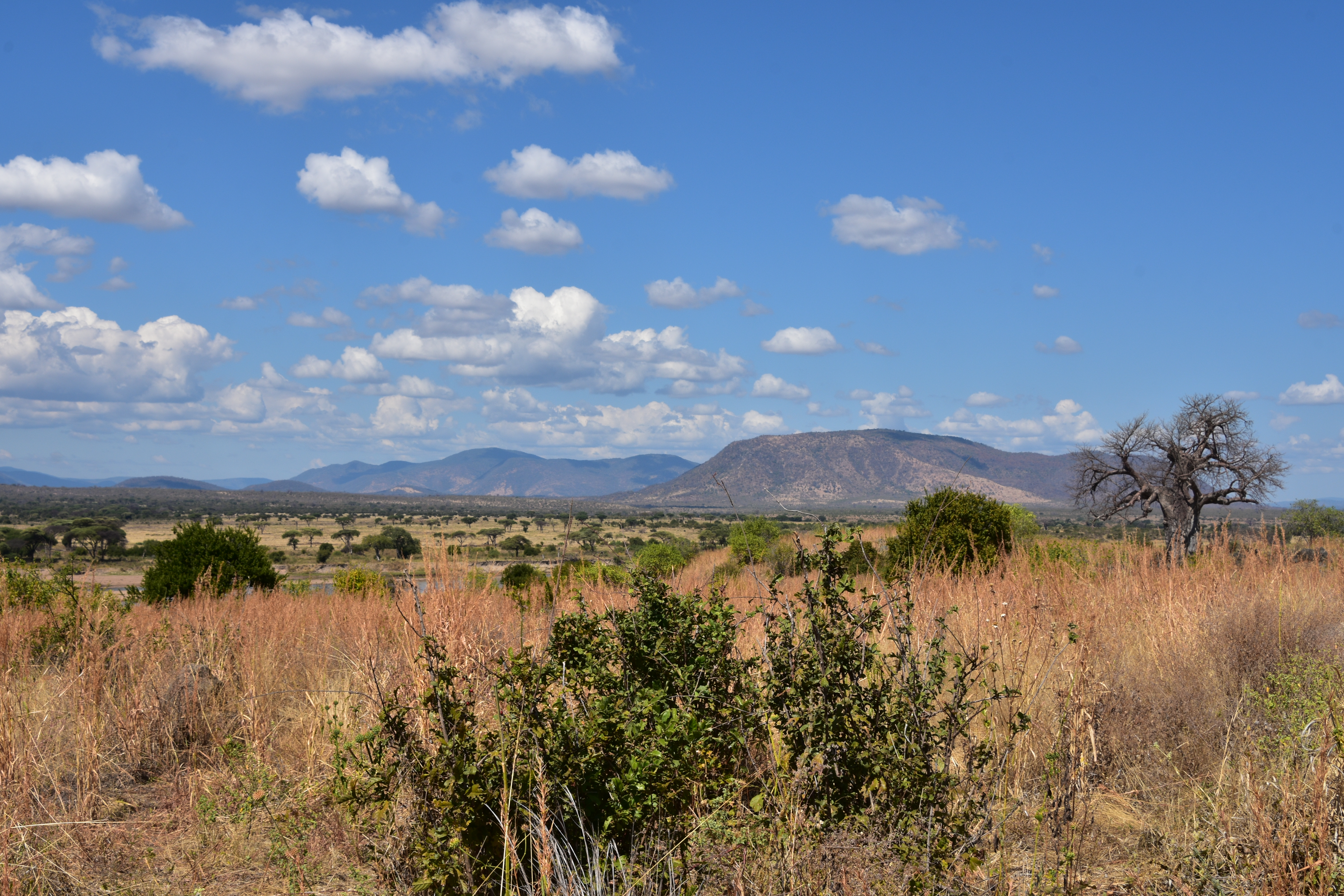
- landscape in Ruaha National Park, Tanzania

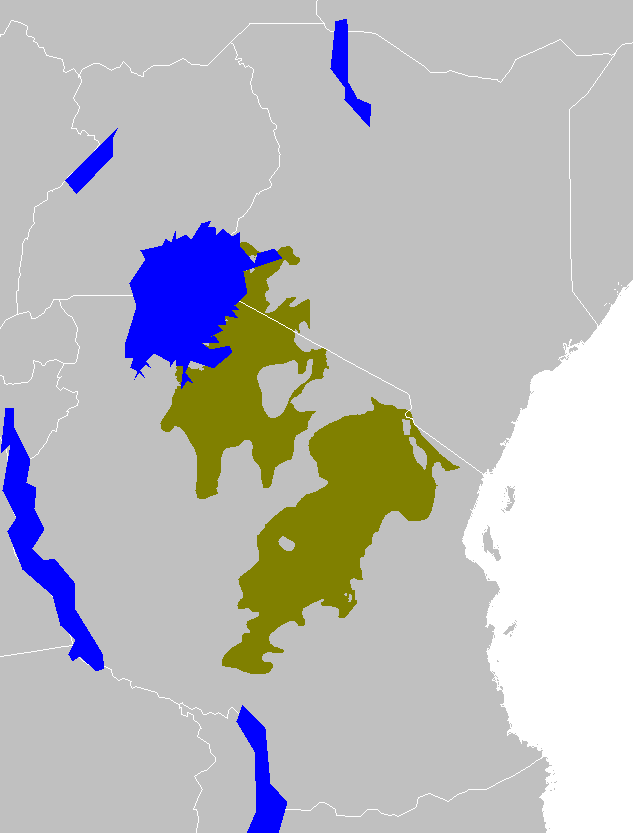
- Map of the Southern Acacia–Commiphora bushlands and thickets ecoregion

Ecology
- Realm: Afrotropical
- Biome: Tropical and subtropical grasslands, savannas, and shrublands
- Borders: List: Central Zambezian miombo woodlands; East African montane forests; Eastern Arc forests; Eastern miombo woodlands; Northern Acacia–Commiphora bushlands and thickets; Serengeti volcanic grasslands; Victoria Basin forest–savanna mosaic; Zambezian flooded grasslands

Geography
- Area: 229,000 km^{2} (88,000 sq mi)
- Countries: Kenya, Tanzania

Conservation
- Conservation status: vulnerable
- Protected: 33.17%

The Southern Acacia–Commiphora bushlands and thickets is a tropical grasslands, savannas, and shrublands ecoregion in Tanzania and Kenya. It includes portions of Serengeti National Park and Ngorongoro Conservation Area, which are designated World Heritage Sites and biosphere reserves for their outstanding wildlife and landscapes. It is one of three Acacia–Commiphora bushlands and thickets ecoregions in eastern Africa.

== Geography ==
The Southern Acacia–Commiphora bushlands and thickets consist of two continuous blocks. The southern block lies west of the Eastern Arc Mountains in Tanzania, in the drier rain shadow of the mountains. It extends northeast-southwest, from the southern slope of Mount Kilimanjaro to the Usangu Plain at the edge of the Southern Highlands. Tarangire and Ruaha national parks are in the southern block.

A belt of miombo woodland, Serengeti volcanic grasslands, and East African montane forests separate the northern and southern blocks. The northern block lies to the east and south of Lake Victoria in southwestern Kenya and northern Tanzania. It includes the western portion of Serengeti National Park.

== Climate ==
The climate is tropical, with average rainfall of 600 to 800 mm. There are two annual rainy seasons – a long rainy season from March to May, and a short rainy season in November and December. During the long August to October dry season, the grasslands dry out and many trees lose their leaves.

== Flora ==
The predominant vegetation types are open grassland, savanna, and open-canopy woodland, with species of Acacia, Commiphora, and Crotalaria as the dominant trees, and Themeda triandra, Setaria incrassata, Panicum coloratum, Aristida adscensionis, Andropogon spp., and Eragrostis spp. as the dominant grasses.

== Fauna ==
The ecoregion is home to globally outstanding populations of large mammals, including great herds of wildebeest (Connochaetes taurinus), plains zebra (Equus burchelli), and Thomson's gazelles (Gazella thomsoni). Large predators include lions (Panthera leo), leopards (Panthera pardus), spotted hyenas (Crocuta crocuta), cheetahs (Acinonyx jubatus), and African wild dogs (Lycaon pictus).

== Protected areas and conservation ==
33.17% of the ecoregion is in protected areas. Kenya's Masai Mara National Reserve (1510.0 km^{2}), the northern and western portions of Tanzania's Serengeti National Park (14763.0 km^{2}), and Ngorongoro Conservation Area (8094.4 km^{2}), are in the northern portion of the ecoregion. The three protected areas and adjacent smaller ones form a large connected wild area, which can accommodate the large annual migration of wildebeest, other grazing mammals, and predators from the adjacent Serengeti volcanic grasslands to the Acacia–Commiphora savanna at the May onset of the long dry season.

Kenya's Ruma National Park protects 120.0 km^{2} near the eastern shore of Lake Victoria.

Ruaha National Park (14506.69 km^{2}), Tanzania's largest, and adjacent game reserves and wildlife conservation areas preserve a broad swath in the southwest.

Tarangire National Park (2615.8 km^{2}) and the adjacent Lokisale, Simanjiro, Landanai, Ruvu Masai, Kitwai, Handeni game conservation areas, Masai and Talamai open areas, and Makame Wildlife Conservation Area, protect a large area in the northeast.
