= East African Plateau =

Plateau in Uganda, Kenya and Tanzania

- Plateau
- Location within Africa
- Coordinates: 0°1′40.3″S 36°33′39.1″E
- Location: Central Africa

The East African Plateau is a large plateau in the eastern part of central Africa in Uganda, Kenya and Tanzania. Its elevation is mostly between 1000 and 1500 meters. It is subdivided into a number of zones running north and south and consisting in turn of mountain ranges, tablelands, and rift valleys. The most striking feature is the existence of two great lines of rift valleys, due largely to the subsidence of segments of the Earth's crust, the lowest parts of which are occupied by vast lakes. Towards the south the two lines converge and give place to one great valley (occupied by Lake Nyasa, or Lake Malawi), the southern part of which is less distinct due to rifting and subsidence than the rest of the system.
