= Eastern Arc Mountains =

Mountain range in Kenya and Tanzania

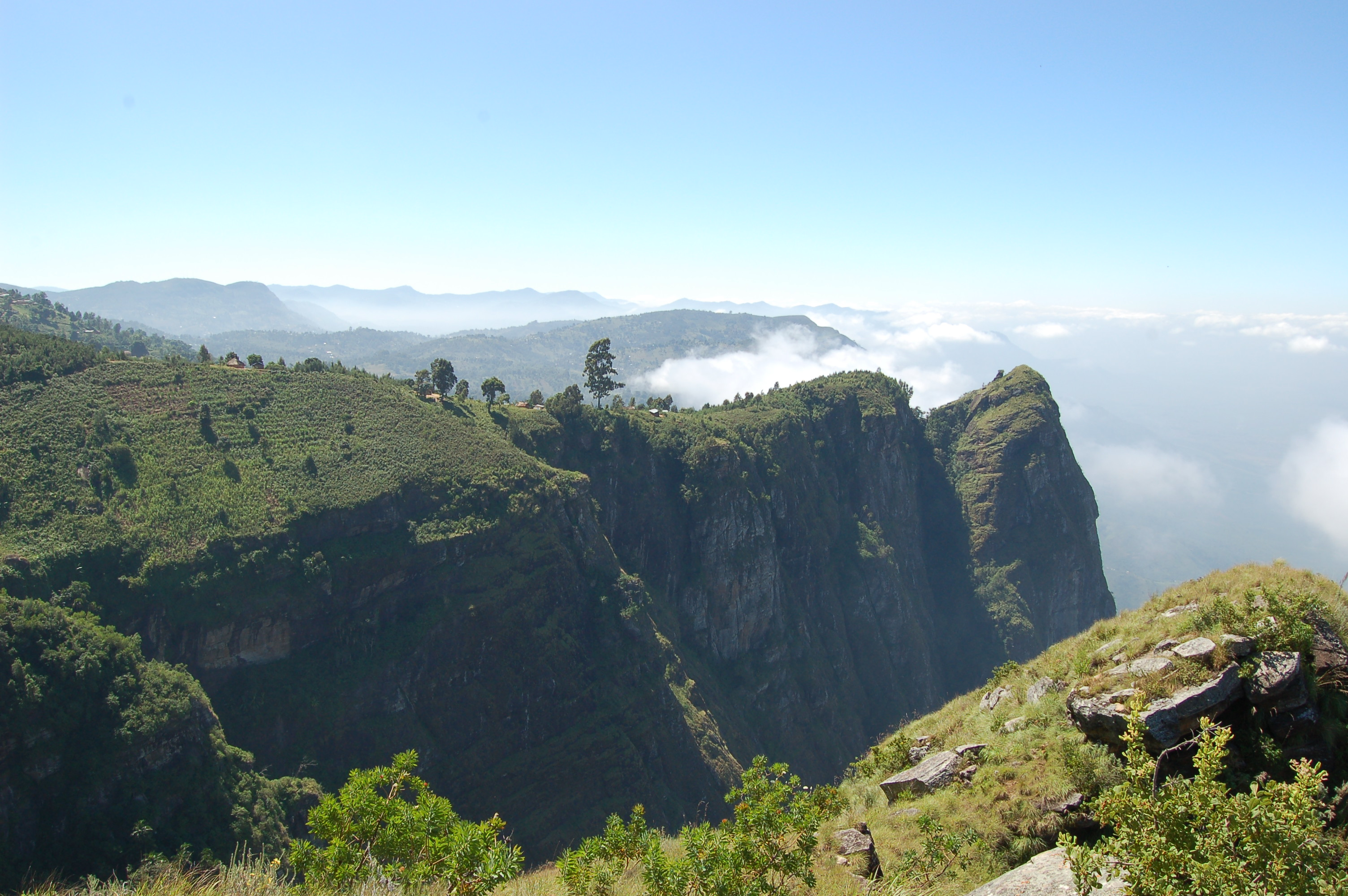
- Usambara Mountains

Geography
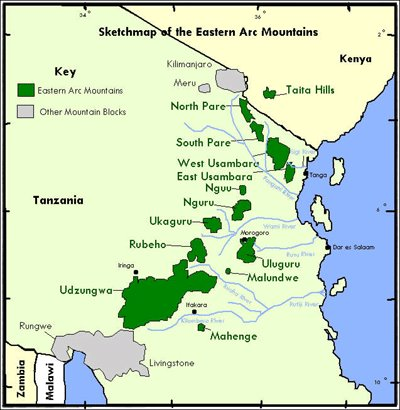
- Location in Tanzania and Kenya
- Countries: Tanzania and Kenya
- Range coordinates: 6.00°S 36.00°E
- Borders on: Kipengere Range

The Eastern Arc Mountains are a chain of mountains found in Kenya and Tanzania. The chain runs from northeast to southwest, with the Taita Hills being in Kenya and the other ranges being in Tanzania. They are delimited on the southwest by the fault complex represented by the Makambako Gap that separates them from the Kipengere Range. To the northeast, they are delimited by more recent volcanism represented by Mount Kilimanjaro. The chain is considered a tentative World Heritage Site.

== Mountain ranges ==
The Eastern Arc Mountains form a roughly crescent-shaped arc and consist of:

1. Taita Hills
2. North and South Pare Mountains
3. East and West Usambara Mountains
4. Nguru Mountains
5. Ukaguru Mountains
6. Uluguru Mountains
7. Uvidunda Mountains
8. Rubeho Mountains
9. Malundwe Mountain
10. Udzungwa Mountains
11. Mahenge Mountains

== Geology ==
These mountain ranges are the oldest in East Africa, and though physically separated from each other, share a similar geomorphology and ecology. They were formed at least 100 million years ago along a fault lying to the east of the East African Rift, which is a more recent structure. About 30 million years ago, all this area was covered by extensive rainforest. During a period some 10 million years ago, when the climate was cooler and drier, the lowland forests were converted to savanna, leaving the mountain ranges as "islands" where the tropical forests continued to flourish, fed by moisture-laden winds from the Indian Ocean. This isolation of each mountain range has led to a great deal of endemism, and a very diverse flora and fauna. The Eastern Arc has become known as one of the world's top-20 biodiversity hotspots.

== Flora and fauna ==
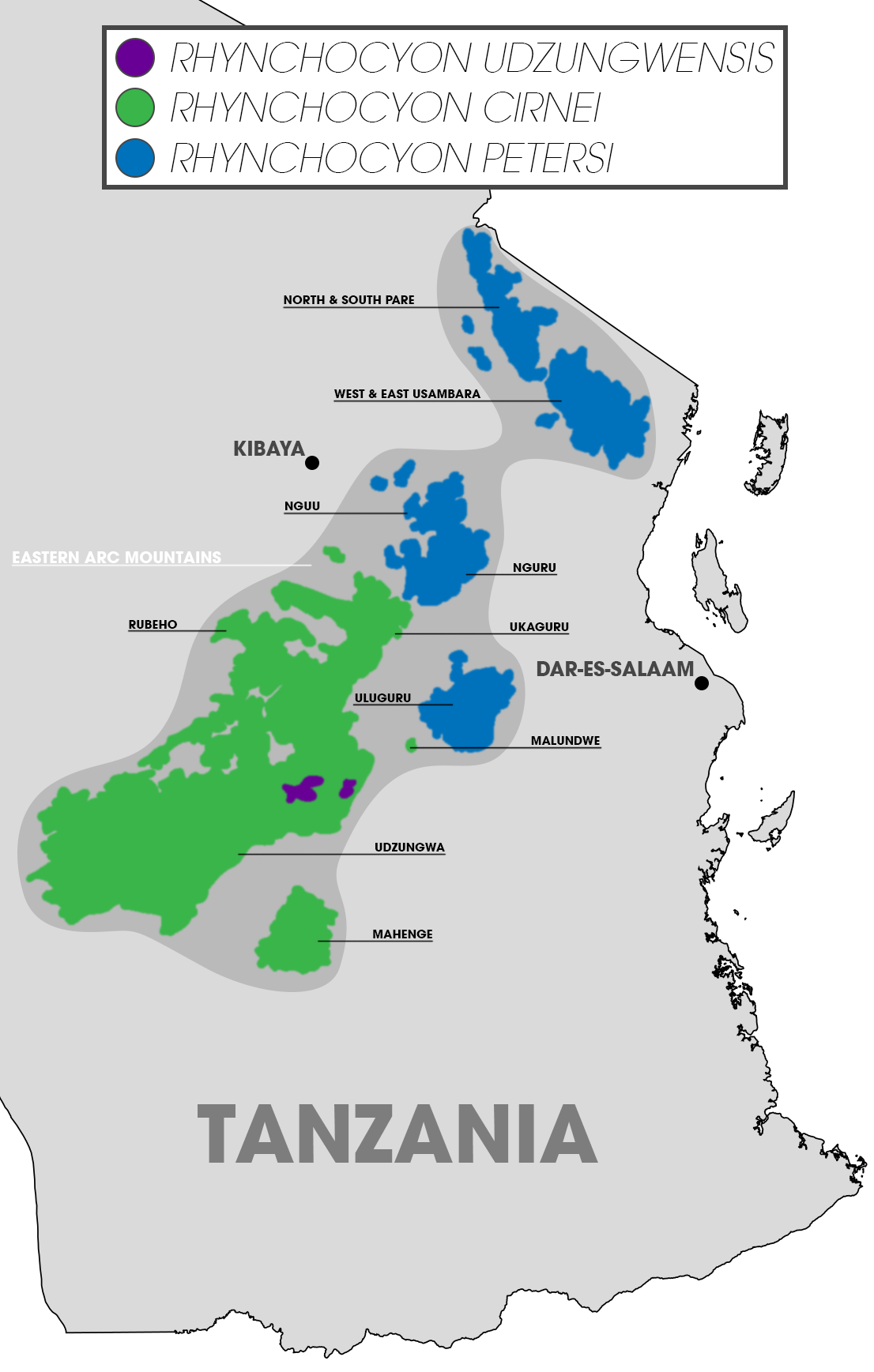
The Rhynchocyon elephant shrews are common mammal species found within the Eastern Arc Mountains. The distribution map shows the three species are typically limited to small, fragmented forest patches within the mountains.

Seventy-five species of vertebrate are endemic to the Eastern Arc, as well as thousands of species of invertebrates. About 15 plant genera are endemic to these mountains, as well as Streptocarpus sect. Saintpaulia, the African violet, now used as a houseplant around the world. Many of these endemics have evolved recently, but some are remnants of populations that were at one time more widespread. The Uluguru Mountains and the eastern Usambara Mountains have the greatest degree of biodiversity. Many endemic species are found on a single mountain range. Four of the endemic birds are similar to Asian species, and may have evolved at a time when the Arabian Peninsula had a coastal fringe of vegetation to act as a passageway; the Udzungwa forest partridge (Xenoperdix udzungwensis) is a relict and example of this, it is found only on the Rubeho Mountains and Udzungwa Mountains, and its closest relatives appear to be the hill partridges of Asia.

== See also ==
- Eastern Arc forests
