= Eastern miombo woodlands =

Ecoregion in eastern Africa

Coordinates: 18.045694°S 35.628972°E

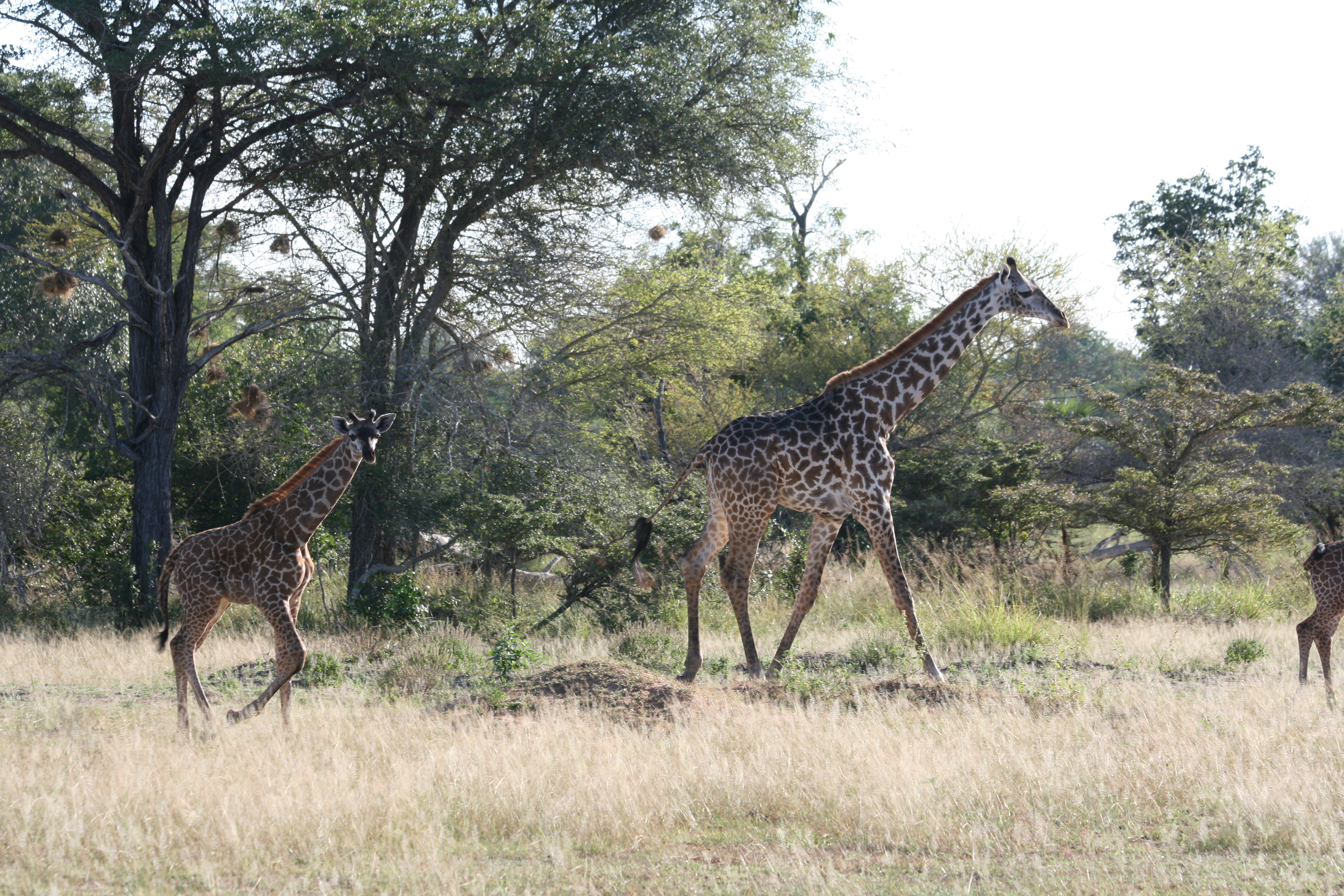
- Giraffes in the Selous Game Reserve, Tanzania.

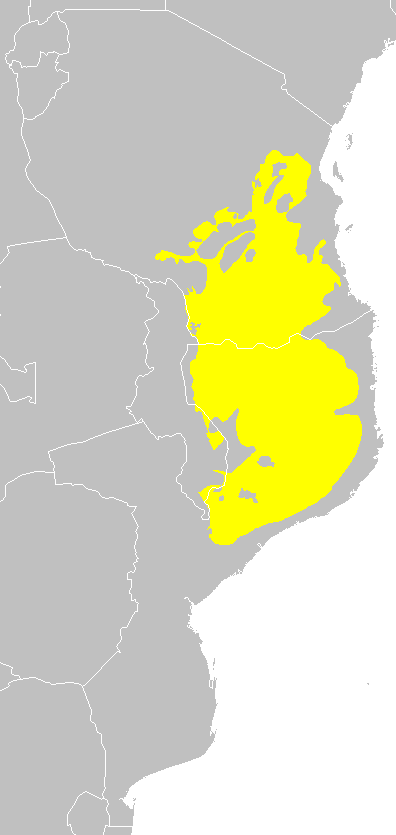
- Map of the Eastern miombo woodlands ecoregion

Ecology
- Realm: Afrotropic
- Biome: Tropical and subtropical grasslands, savannas, and shrublands

Geography
- Area: 483,800 km^{2} (186,800 mi^{2})
- Countries: Malawi, Mozambique, and Tanzania

Conservation
- Conservation status: relatively stable/intact
- Global 200: yes
- Protected: 155,682 km^{2} (32.3%)

The Eastern miombo woodlands (AT0706) are an ecoregion of grassland and woodland in northern Mozambique, southern Tanzania, and southeastern Malawi.

== Setting ==
These species-rich savanna ecosystems cover wide areas of gentle hills and low valleys containing rivers and dambo wetlands. The region is located on the East African Plateau, extending from inland south-eastern Tanzania to cover the northern half of Mozambique, with small areas in neighbouring Malawi. They are a section of the belt of miombo woodland that crosses Africa south of the Congo rain forests and the savannas of East Africa. The ecoregion covers an area of 483,900 square kilometers (186,800 sq mi). It is bounded by the Northern and Southern Zanzibar-Inhambane coastal forest mosaic to the east along the Indian Ocean, and by the Zambezian and mopane woodlands in the Zambezi lowlands to the southwest, and by Lake Malawi to the west. To the north and northwest, the forested Eastern Arc Mountains separate the eastern miombo woodlands from the Southern Acacia-Commiphora bushlands and thickets of central Tanzania.

The region has a hot, tropical climate with a wet summer from November to March and a long winter drought. The woodlands are vulnerable to fire, particularly at the start of the summer.

== Flora and fauna ==
The predominant tree is miombo (Brachystegia spp.), along with Baikiaea woodland.

Despite the low rainfall and relatively nutrient-poor soil the woodland is home to many species. The miombo and other vegetation in and around the region have historically a variety of food and cover for several miombo specialist endemic bird and lizard species as well as more widespread mammals including herds of African elephant (Loxodonta africana), giraffe, Burchell's zebra (Equus burchelli), wildebeest (Connochaetes taurinus) and hippopotamus (Hippopotamus amphibius) and antelopes including greater kudu (Tragelaphus strepsiceros), eland (Taurotragus oryx), impala (Aepyceros melampus), Roosevelt sable antelope (Hippotragus niger) and Lichtenstein's hartebeest (Sigmoceros lichtensteinii) (Campbell 1996). The roan antelope is mysteriously absent from the Eastern Miombo woodlands, and the long dry season and poor soils do not support the large herds of herbivores found further north in Tanzania. Large carnivores in the region include lion (Panthera leo), leopard (Panthera pardus), cheetah (Acinonyx jubatus), spotted hyena (Crocuta crocuta) and side-striped jackal (Canis adustus). The African wild dog (Lycaon pictus) population of the Selous Game Reserve is the largest known population on the continent

The region is also rich in bird life, including the near-endemic Stierling's woodpecker as well as other species like vultures, fish eagle, kingfisher, yellow billed stork and plover.

Reptiles include common crocodiles while the endemics are the two sub-species of the spotted flat lizard, and the chameleon Chamaeleon tornieri (although the validity of this last species classification has been questioned).

== People ==
The ecoregion is thinly populated by humans, partly due to tsetse fly and the Mozambique Civil War, but the miombo woodlands are important to the livelihoods of the rural people, who depend on the resources available from the woodland. The wide variety of species provides non-timber products such as fruits, honey, fodder for livestock and fuelwood. In Tanzania however a large portion of the ecoregion is covered by Selous Game Reserve, the largest protected area in Africa. There are areas of Eastern Miombo woodland in Tanzania south of Selous, in the regions of Ruvuma and Lindi. In Mozambique the region is contained within the sparsely populated Niassa and the inland areas of Cabo Delgado, Nampula and Zambezia.

== Conservation and threats ==
32.3% of the ecoregion is in protected areas. Selous Game Reserve (44,000 km^{2}) is a major element of conservation in this ecoregion, along with Ruaha National Park (14506.7 km^{2}), Niassa Reserve (42,000 km^{2}), and other national parks in Mozambique which suffered during the civil war and are in a state of reconstruction. Smaller protected areas lying mostly within the ecoregion include Mikumi National Park (3233.88 km^{2}) in Tanzania and Gilé National Reserve (2100 km^{2}) in Mozambique.

Even outside protected areas the woodlands have remained comparatively intact due to the sparse human population. However the woodlands are being slowly cleared for farmland and pasture throughout. There is little commercial logging except for the African blackwood (Dalbergia melanoxylon), whose timber is highly valuable. Poaching of elephant and rhino are a threat, especially in Mozambique.

Many areas of miombo woodland are still managed in traditional ways, with slash and burn farming systems dominating, but in some areas alternative land management practices are being promoted. One such example is the N'hambita Community Carbon Project in the Sofala Province of Mozambique. This was developed as a result of the increasing concern about global climate change, and the recent evolution of carbon markets, paired with a need for poverty reduction and alternative livelihoods where rural communities lack the resources to prevent environmental degradation. These carbon markets are part of the 'Payments for Ecosystem services' (PES) system and in this case finance from the sale of carbon offsets is used to incentivise and sustain activities which increase carbon sequestration and protect existing carbon stocks in forests.

The N'hambita project was launched in 2003 as a collaboration between the environmental company Envirotrade Ltd. and the University of Edinburgh. To date (Jan 2009) the project has engaged 1350 farmers or 'producer's in agroforestry and woodland restoration and conservation activities. Those involved have benefited from staged payments, continued technical support and have been encouraged to become involved in other micro-finance initiatives, such as beekeeping and carpentry, using miombo tree species planted within the project.

The Plan Vivo System is used, which was pioneered, and has run successfully in Mexico for over 10 years in the Scolel Te project. Plan Vivo projects are registered and reviewed under standards developed by the Plan Vivo Foundation. Producers who sign up to the scheme must agree to manage their land according to their plan vivo, a long term land management plan evaluated and registered by the local project manager.
