= Udzungwa Mountains =

Mountain range in south-central Tanzania

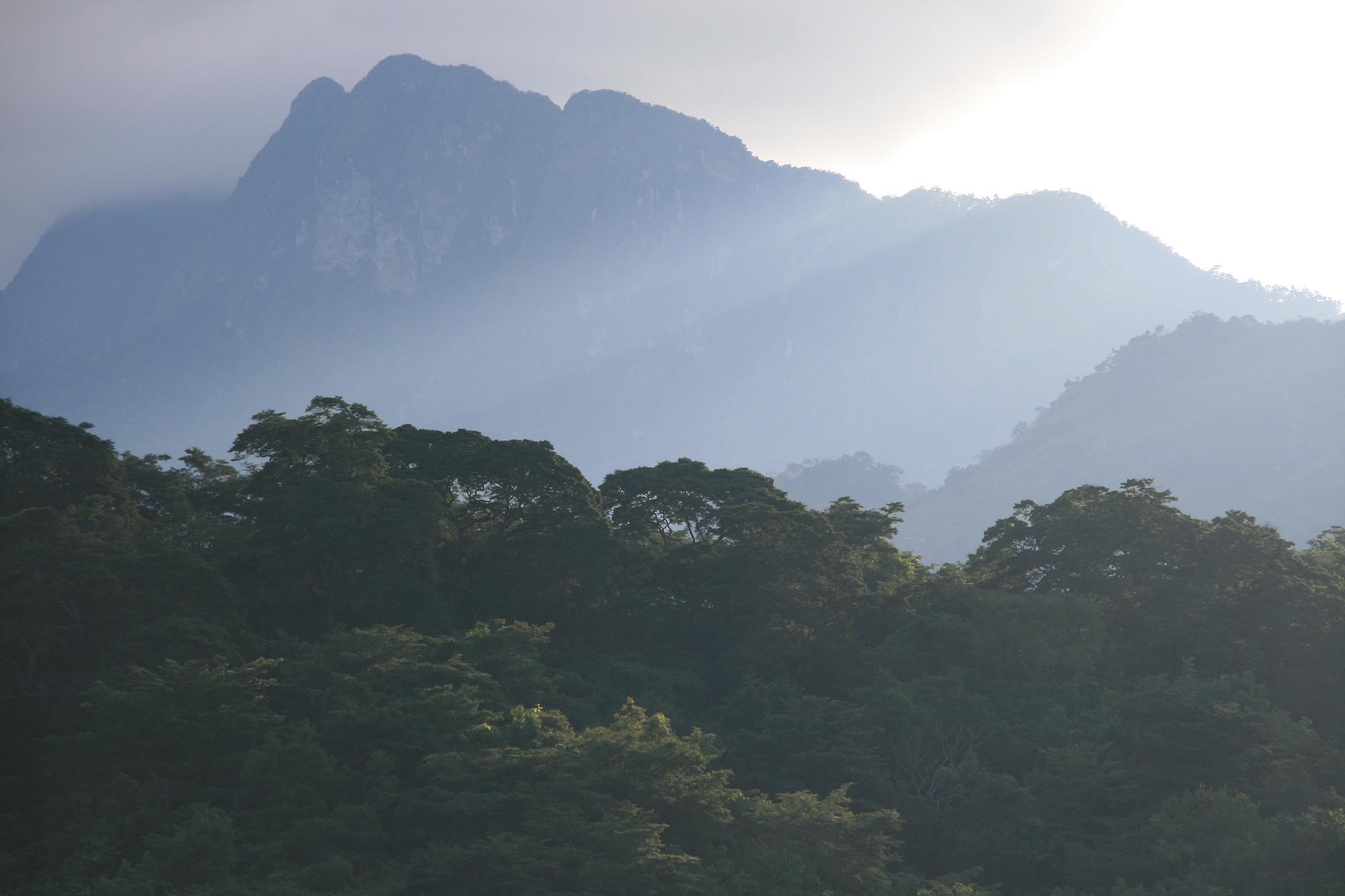

Highest point
- Elevation: 2,563 m (8,409 ft)
- Prominence: 1,270 m (4,170 ft)
- Listing: Ribu
- Coordinates: 07°46′S 36°49′E

Geography
- Location within Tanzania
- Location: Iringa Region

The Udzungwa Mountains are a mountain range in south-central Tanzania. The mountains are mostly within Iringa Region, south of Tanzania's capital Dodoma. The Udzungwa Mountains are part of the Eastern Arc Mountains, and are home to a biodiverse community of flora and fauna with large numbers of endemic species.

The mountains are home to the Hehe people, and the name Udzungwa comes from the Kihehe word “Wadzungwa", which means the people who live on mountainsides. Iringa is the largest settlement in the mountains, and the regional headquarters.

== Geography ==
The Undzungwa Mountains cover an area of 16,131.40 km^{2} (6,228.37 sq mi), the largest of the Eastern Arc ranges. The highest peak in the range is Luhombero at 2,579 metres (1.603 mi). The mountain range extends generally northeast-southwest. The Usangu Plain lies to the northwest, drained by the Great Ruaha River and its tributaries. The Great Ruaha River separates the Udzungwa Mountains from the Rubeho Mountains and Uvidunda Mountains to the northeast. The Kilombero River valley lies to the south and southeast. To the southwest the Makambako Gap separates the Udzungwa Mountains from the Kipengere Range.

Both the Great Ruaha and Kilombero rivers are tributaries of the Rufiji River, which empties into the Indian Ocean. The Lukosi River originates in the central part of the range, and empties eastwards into the Great Ruaha. The Little Ruaha River and its tributaries drain much of the western portion of the range, emptying northwards into the Great Ruaha.

== Climate ==
The Udzungwa Mountains intercept moisture-laden winds from the Indian Ocean, and receive more rainfall than the surrounding lowlands. Most of the rainfall occurs in the November-to-May wet season, although mist and light rain occur at higher elevations during the dry season months. Rainfall is higher on the southern and southeastern slopes facing the Indian Ocean, and lower in the mountains' rain shadow to the north and west. Temperatures are cooler at higher elevations.

== Geology ==
The Udzungwa Mountains, along with the others in the Eastern Arc, are made up of ancient crystalline Precambrian rocks that were uplifted over millions of years along fault lines. The most recent period of uplift started 30 million years ago, but the fault system and uplift process may be far older. Soils derived from these ancient rocks are not as fertile as the younger volcanic soils of mountains to the north and west.

== Flora and fauna ==
About 30 MYA, the area was covered by extensive rainforest. During a cooler and drier period some 10 MYA, the lowland forests were converted to savanna, leaving the mountain ranges as "islands" where the tropical forests continued to flourish. The long-term persistence of a humid climate and the isolation of each mountain range has led to a great deal of endemism, and a very diverse flora and fauna. The Udzungwa and other Eastern Arc mountains has extremely high biodiversity with numerous endemic species (more than 25% of the vertebrate species). 10% of them are protected by the Udzungwa Mountains National Park and the Udzungwa Scarp Nature Forest Reserve.

The Udzungwa Mountains are covered with lowland rainforest, montane rainforest, miombo woodland, grassland, and heathland. Forests extend from 300 to 2,579 m (984 to 8,461 ft) elevation, and vary in composition and species type with elevation and rainfall. The wetter eastern and southeastern slopes receive more rain from the Indian Ocean and support evergreen forests on the lower slopes; the drier western and northwestern slopes have deciduous miombo forests and woodlands at lower elevations and evergreen forests only at higher elevations.

Broad areas of forest on the central plateau have been cleared for agriculture and pasture. An analysis of satellite images taken between 1999 and 2003 found 1,353 km^{2} (522 sq mi) of the mountains were still covered in evergreen forest.

The mountains are home to many mammals, including Abbott's duiker (Cephalophus spadix), Kipunji (Rungwecebus kipunji), and Udzungwa red colobus (Cercocebus galeritus). Elephants (Loxodonta africana) are found in the forests along the southern escarpment. The grey-faced sengi (Rhynchocyon udzungwensis) is a species of elephant shrew endemic to the mountains. The Udzungwa forest partridge (Xenoperdix udzungwensis) is also endemic, and its closest relatives appear to be the hill partridges of Asia.

Although the two mountain groups are ecologically distinct, the Eastern Arc Mountains share many species and plant communities with the Southern Highlands which lie to the southwest across the Makambako Gap. Both are Afromontane regions, home to characteristic montane species and ecologically distinct from the adjacent lowlands. The Southern Highlands' climate is more influenced by Lake Malawi than by the Indian Ocean. Some limited-range montane species, including the Kipunji and Kipengere seedeater (Crithagra melanochrous), inhabit both the Udzungwa Mountains and the Kipengere Range.

The Kihansi spray toad (Nectophrynoides asperginis), which was found only around a waterfall on the Kihansi River, became extinct in the wild in 2009 when an upstream dam altered its habitat. The toads have since been reintroduced after a successful captive breeding program.

== Protected areas and conservation ==
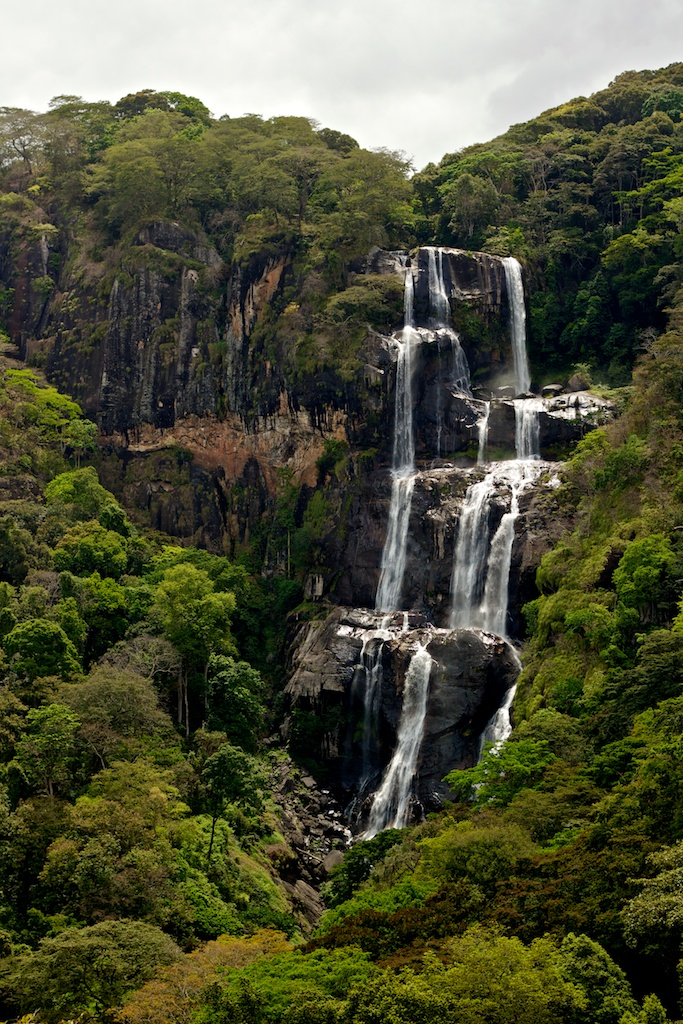
Sanje Falls

Protected areas include Udzungwa Mountains National Park (2,088.69 km^{2} (806.45 sq mi)), and Udzungwa Scarp (202.2 km^{2} (78.1 sq mi)), Kisinga-Rugaro (141.64 km^{2} (54.69 sq mi)) and West Kilombero (c.550 km^{2} (210 sq mi) outside the national park) forest reserves.

It is possible to visit the Udzungwa Mountains National Park and go hiking and trekking. The park has no roads passable by vehicle and is accessible only by foot. The trekking routes vary, from the short and easy one-hour Sonjo Waterfall hike to the extremely difficult 6 day trek the Lumemo Trail. The most popular route is the Sanje Waterfalls trail, taking about four hours to complete.

The World Wide Fund for Nature is working with local communities to protect the park and provide conservation and management support, monitoring, research and ecotourism initiatives. The help of the local communities is encouraged by giving them access to resources such as the collection of firewood, harvesting medicinal plants and gathering grass for thatching.

== Transport ==
Tanzania's A104 highway runs from northeast to southwest through the central plateau of the mountains, extending northeastwards to Dodoma and southwestwards to Makambako, Mbeya, and the border with Zambia. The A7 highway meets the A104 at Iringa, and extends eastwards through the mountains to Morogoro and Dar es Salaam.

The Tazara Railway passes along the southern escarpment of the Udzungwa Mountains, passing through Kidatu (where it meets the Misuku branch of Tanzania's Central Line at a break of gauge), Katulukilla, Mang’ula, Kiberege, Siginali, Ifakara, Idete, Ruipa, Mbinga, Mngeta, Ikule, Chita, Chisano, Mlimba, Lumumwe, Mpanga, Kitete, Kimbwe, Uchindile, Mgololo, Kiyowela, Kitandililo, and Mahongole.
