= Uluguru Mountains =

Mountain range in Tanzania

Uluguru mountains
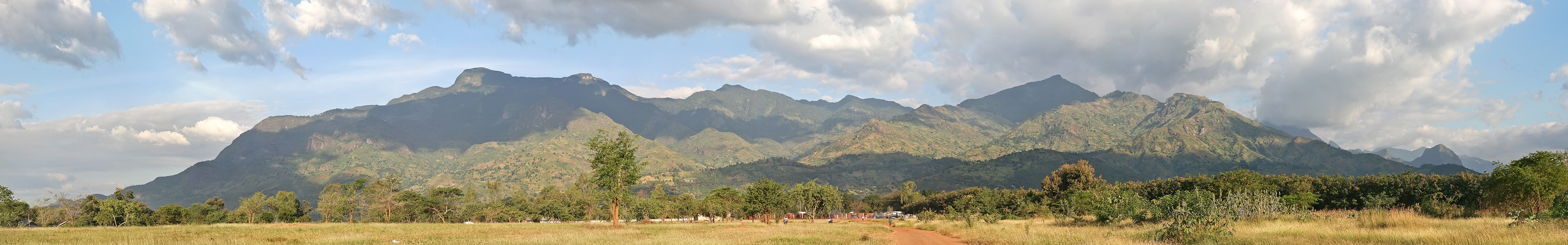
- Uluguru mountain ranges

Highest point
- Elevation: 2,630 m (8,630 ft)

Geography
- Location within Tanzania
- Country: Tanzania
- City: Morogoro
- Range coordinates: 7°10′S 37°40′E

The Uluguru mountains are a mountain range in eastern Tanzania, named after the Luguru tribe. The main portion of the Uluguru mountains is a ridge running roughly north-south and rising to 2,630 metres (8,600 ft) altitude at its highest point. On the main Uluguru range, 50 villages touch the forest boundary and over 151,000 people are found within the mountain area, often at increasing densities at higher altitudes up to the forest boundary.

== Geography ==
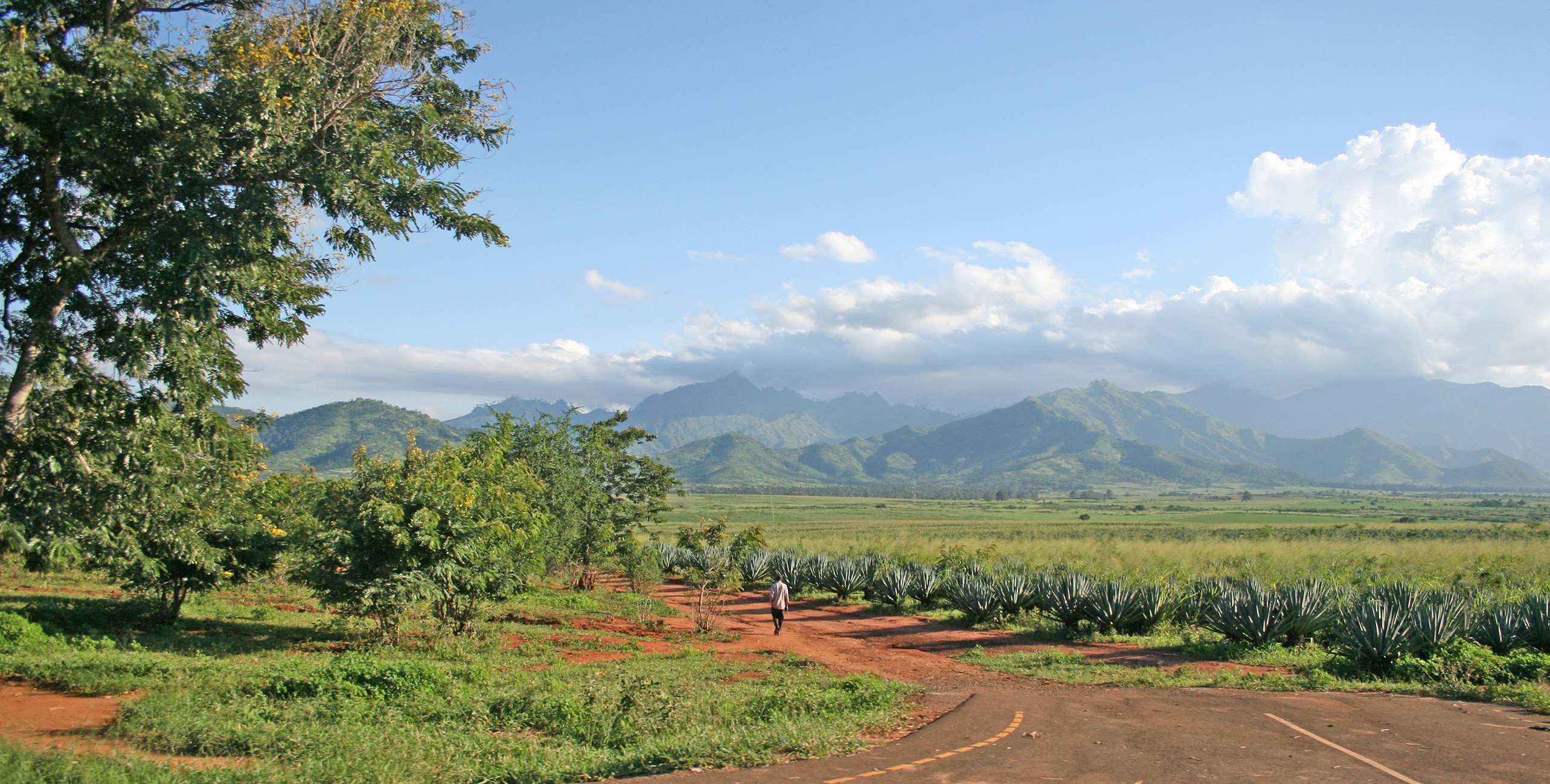
Sisal plantation in the outskirts of Morogoro. Uluguru mountains are visible in the background.

The Ulugurus lie 200 km inland from the Indian Ocean. They are part of a chain of mountains in eastern Africa collectively called the Eastern Arc Mountains, which include the Taita Hills, Pare Mountains, Usambara Mountains, Nguru Mountains, Rubeho, Ukaguru, Udzungwa Mountains and Mahenge Mountains.

== Vegetation ==
The vegetation of the Uluguru main ridge and outlying blocks is extremely variable. It ranges from drier lowland coastal forest habitats, to transitional rainforests, to sub-montane, montane and upper montane forest types.

== Climate ==
Climatically, the Uluguru mountains capture moisture passing inland from the Indian Ocean making the east facing slopes especially wet, with rainfall estimated at over 3,000 millimetres (120 in) per annum, and some rain falling in every month.

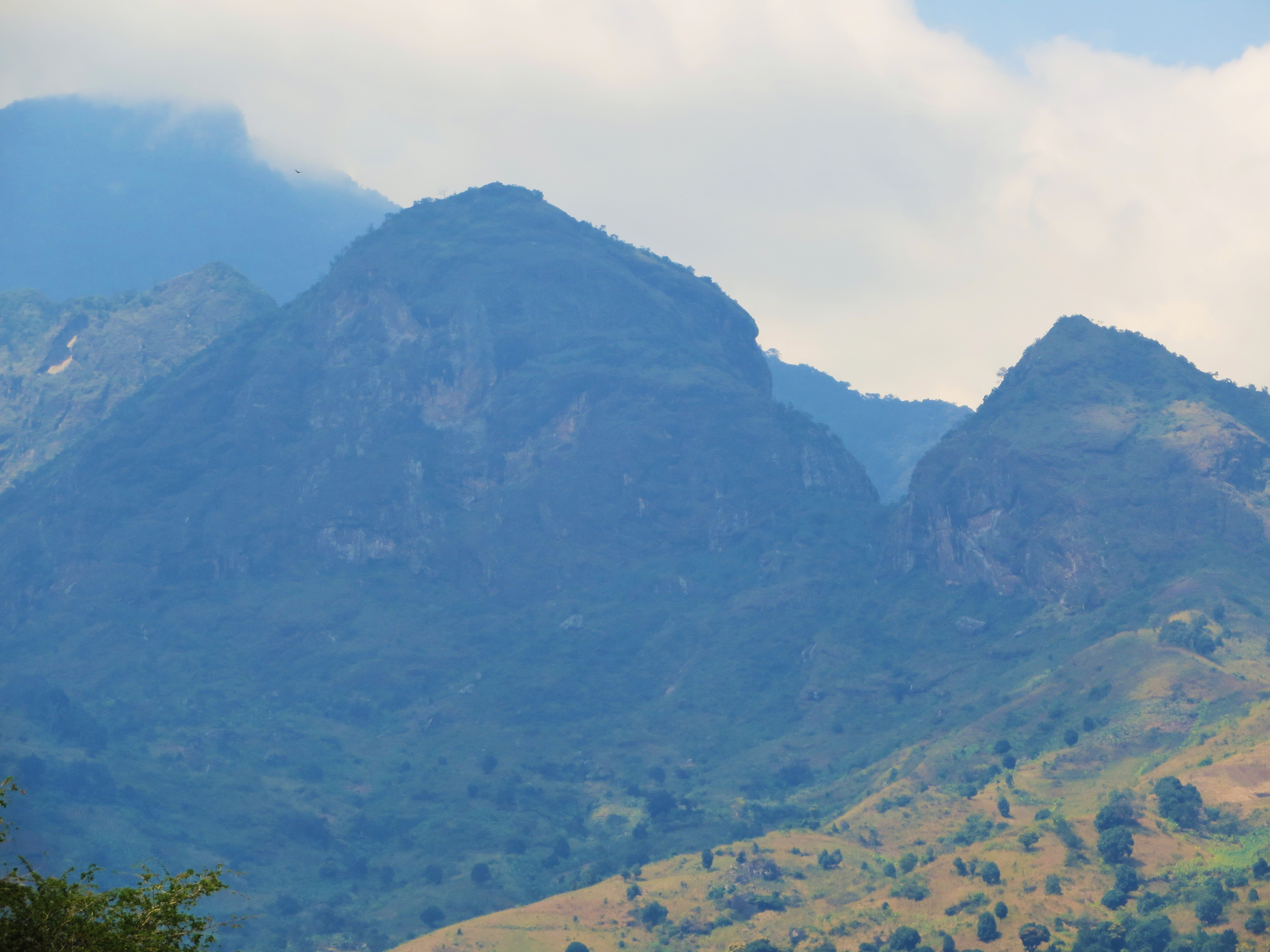
Uluguru mountains in the background of Morogoro city.

== Water catchment ==
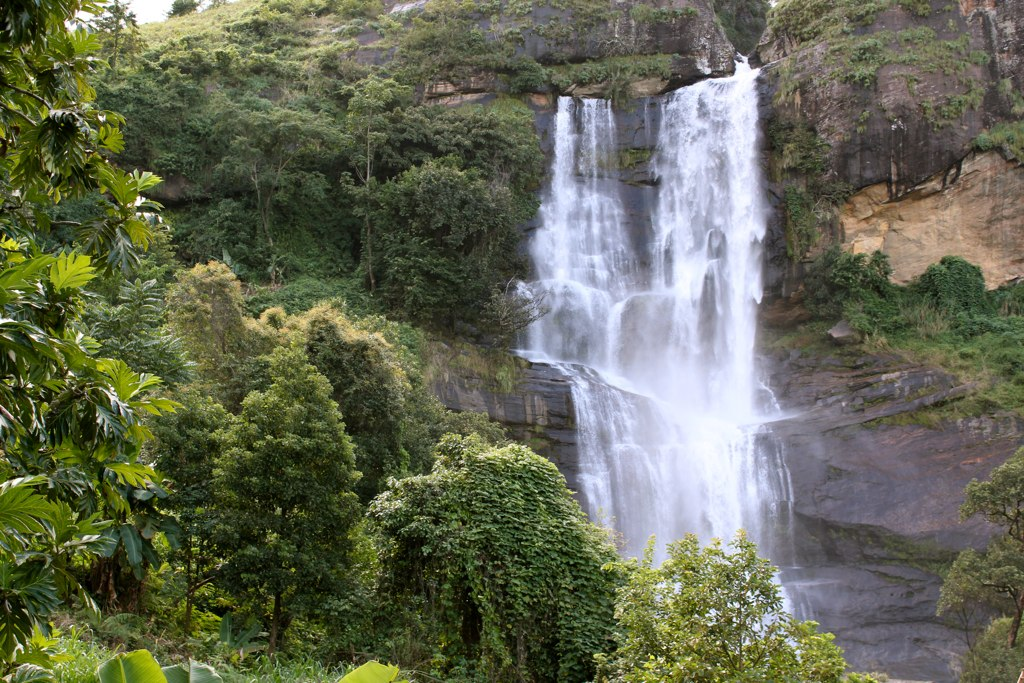
A remote waterfall near Kinole

The forests of the mountains provide the water catchment areas for the streams and rivers. This water flows mainly from the forest-capped peaks of the Ulugurus into streams joining to form the Ruvu River, which provides the water supply to the city of Dar es Salaam. Most of the neighboring population, around 3 million people, and the major industries in Tanzania rely on this water supply for their continued survival. The loss of the Uluguru forests and any reduction in the water supply potential of the mountains could therefore have a drastic impact on the human well-being and industrial capacity of Tanzania.

== Local people ==
The local people of the Ulugurus are the Waluguru tribe people. They have been living in the mountains for several hundred years, coming from other areas of Tanzania. Their land ownership is through the female line and women are powerful in village life, in contrast to other tribes in Tanzania where men own the land and make most of the decisions about its use and management.

== Biodiversity ==
Unique to the Ulugurus are over 100 plants, 2 birds, 2 mammals, 4 reptiles and 6 amphibians unknown elsewhere in the world. There are also a large number of additional species shared only with one or two other Eastern Arc mountains, and hence globally rare. Endemic species include African violets, Impatiens and Begonias which are popular pot-plants in the rest of the world. The Uluguru mountain grasshopper, a critically endangered species according to The IUCN Red List of Threatened Species is also native to these mountains.

== Tourism ==
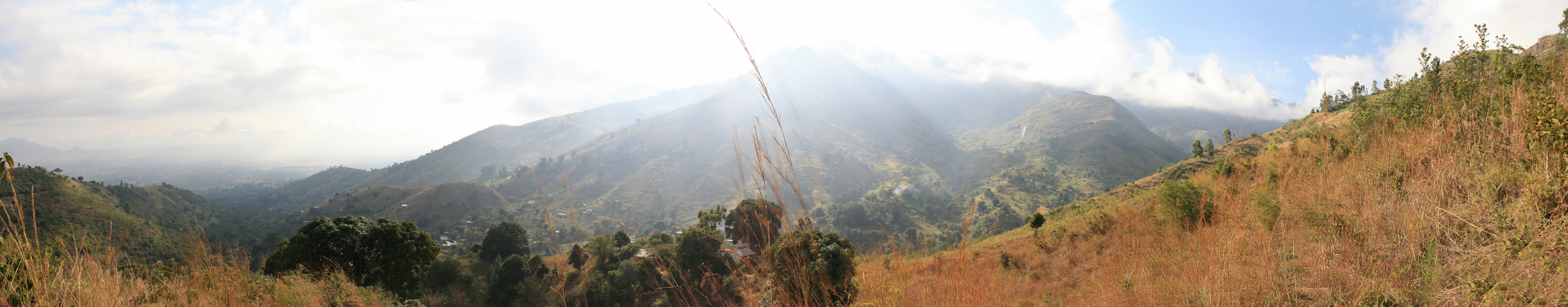
Sunrise over one of the mountains

The mountains attracts many tourists to the area, particularly due to the mountains' proximity to the former capital and economic center of Tanzania, the city of Dar es Salaam.
