= List of tetrapod families =

The page lists all of the families in the clade Tetrapoda, organized by taxonomic ranks. This list does not include families that are extinct.

== Amphibia ==
=== Order Anura (frogs) ===
- Suborder Archaeobatrachia
  - Family Ascaphidae (tailed frogs)
  - Family Bombinatoridae (fire-belly toads)
  - Family Discoglossidae (painted frogs)
  - Family Leiopelmatidae (New Zealand primitive frogs)
- Suborder Mesobatrachia
  - Family Megophryidae (litter frogs)
  - Family Pelobatidae (European spadefoot toads)
  - Family Pelodytidae (parsley frogs)
  - Family Pipidae (tongueless frogs)
  - Family Rhinophrynidae (Mexican burrowing toad)
  - Family Scaphiopodidae (American spadefoot toads)
- Suborder Neobatrachia
  - Family Allophrynidae (Tukeit Hill frog)
  - Family Amphignathodontidae (marsupial frogs)
  - Family Arthroleptidae (screeching frogs)
  - Family Brachycephalidae (saddleback toads)
  - Family Bufonidae (true toads)
  - Family Centrolenidae (glass frogs)
  - Family Dendrobatidae (poison dart frogs)
  - Family Heleophrynidae (ghost frogs)
  - Family Hemisotidae (shovelnose frogs)
  - Family Hylidae (tree frogs)
  - Family Hyperoliidae (sedge or bush frogs)
  - Family Leptodactylidae (Southern frogs)
  - Family Mantellidae (a diverse family of frogs)
  - Family Microhylidae (narrow mouthed frogs)
  - Family Myobatrachidae (Australian ground frogs)
  - Family Ranidae (true frogs)
  - Family Rhacophoridae (moss frogs)
  - Family Rhinodermatidae (Darwin's frog)
  - Family Sooglossidae (Seychelles frogs)

=== Order Apoda (caecilians) ===
- Family Caeciliidae (common caecilians)
- Family Chikilidae (Indian caecilians)
- Family Dermophiidae
- Family Grandisoniidae
- Family Herpelidae
- Family Ichthyophiidae (Asian tailed caecilians)
- Family Rhinatrematidae (Neotropical tailed caecilians)
- Family Scolecomorphidae (African tropical caecilians)
- Family Siphonopidae
- Family Typhlonectidae (aquatic caecilians)

=== Order Urodela (salamanders) ===
- Suborder Cryptobranchoidea
  - Family Cryptobranchidae (giant salamanders)
  - Family Hynobiidae (Asiatic salamanders)
- Suborder Salamandroidea
  - Family Ambystomatidae (mole salamanders)
  - Family Amphiumidae (amphiumas or Congo eels)
  - Family Dicamptodontidae (Pacific giant salamanders)
  - Family Plethodontidae (lungless salamanders)
  - Family Proteidae (mudpuppies and waterdogs)
  - Family Rhyacotritonidae (torrent salamanders)
  - Family Salamandridae (true salamanders and newts)
- Suborder Sirenoidea
  - Family Sirenidae (sirens)

== Reptilia ==
=== Order Crocodilia (crocodiles) ===
- Family Gavialidae (gharial and false gharial)
- Family Alligatoridae (alligators and caimans)
- Family Crocodylidae (true crocodiles)

=== Order Rhynchocephalia (tuatara) ===
- Family Sphenodontidae (one species: tuatara)

=== Order Squamata (lizards and snakes) ===
- Family Amphisbaenidae (tropical worm lizards)
- Family Bipedidae (other worm lizards)
- Family Blanidae (Mediterranean worm lizards)
- Family Cadeidae (Cuban worm lizards)
- Family Rhineuridae (North American worm lizards)
- Family Trogonophidae (palearctic worm lizards)
- Family Dibamidae (blind lizards)
- Family Gekkonidae (geckos)
- Family Pygopodidae (legless lizards)
- Family Diplodactylidae
- Family Carphodactylidae
- Family Eublepharidae
- Family Sphaerodactylidae
- Family Phyllodactylidae
- Family Agamidae (agamas)
- Family Chamaeleonidae (chameleons)
- Family Corytophanidae (casquehead lizards)
- Family Crotaphytidae (collared lizards)
- Family Iguanidae (true iguanas and relatives)
- Family Leiocephalidae
- Family Hoplocercidae
- Family Dactyloidae
- Family Leiosauridae
- Family Liolaemidae (iguana relatives, such as swifts)
- Family Opluridae (Madagascan iguanas)
- Family Phrynosomatidae (spiny lizards, horn lizards, tree lizards, and more)
- Family Polychrotidae (anoles)
- Family Tropiduridae (neotropical ground lizards)
- Family Gymnophthalmidae (spectacled lizards)
- Family Lacertidae (wall lizards)
- Family Teiidae (tegus)
- Family Anguidae (slowworms, glass lizards, and alligator lizards)
- Family Anniellidae (American legless lizards)
- Family Helodermatidae (gila monsters)
- Family Xenosauridae (knob-scaled lizards)
- Family Lanthanotidae (earless monitor)
- Family Shinisauridae (Chinese crocodile lizard)
- Family Varanidae (monitor lizards)
- Family Cordylidae (spinytail lizards)
- Family Gerrhosauridae (plated lizards)
- Family Scincidae (skinks)
- Family Xantusiidae (night lizards)
- Family Acrochordidae (file snakes)
- Family Aniliidae (coral pipe snakes)
- Family Anomochilidae (dwarf pipe snakes)
- Family Boidae (boas)
- Family Bolyeriidae (Round Island boas)
- Family Colubridae (colubrids)
- Family Cylindrophiidae (Asian pipe snakes)
- Family Elapidae (cobras, sea snakes, and more)
- Family Homalopsidae (mudsnakes)
- Family Lamprophiidae
- Family Loxocemidae (Mexican burrowing snakes)
- Family Pareidae (slug snakes and more)
- Family Pythonidae (pythons)
- Family Tropidophiidae (dwarf boas)
- Family Uropeltidae (shieldtail snakes)
- Family Viperidae (vipers, rattlesnakes, and more)
- Family Xenodermatidae
- Family Xenopeltidae (sunbeam snakes)
- Family Anomalepidae (dawn blind snakes)
- Family Gerrhopilidae (Indo-Malayan blind snakes)
- Family Leptotyphlopidae (slender blind snakes)
- Family Typhlopidae ("true" blind snakes)
- Family Xenotyphlopidae

=== Order Testudines (turtles) ===
- Family Carettochelyidae (pig-nosed turtle)
- Family Cheloniidae (sea turtles)
- Family Chelydridae (snapping turtles)
- Family Dermatemydidae (Central American river turtle)
- Family Dermochelyidae (leatherback sea turtle)
- Family Emydidae (pond turtles)
- Family Geoemydidae (Asian box turtles)
- Family Kinosternidae (mud turtles)
- Family Platysternidae (big-headed turtle)
- Family Testudinidae (tortoises)
- Family Trionychidae (softshell turtles)
- Family Chelidae (Austro-American sideneck turtles)
- Family Pelomedusidae (Afro-American sideneck turtles)
- Family Podocnemididae (South American side-necked river turtles, and 2 other species)

== Aves ==
=== Superorder Galloanserae ===
==== Order Galliformes (gamebirds, or landfowl) ====
- Family Cracidae (chachalacas or guans)
- Family Megapodiidae (megapodes)
- Family Numididae (guineafowls)
- Family Odontophoridae (New World quails)
- Family Phasianidae (pheasants, chickens, Old World quails, and more)

==== Order Anseriformes (waterfowl) ====
- Family Anatidae (duck, geese, swans, and more)
- Family Anhimidae (screamers)
- Family Anseranatidae (magpie-goose)

=== Superorder Neoaves ===
==== Order Phoenicopteriformes (flamingos and extinct relatives) ====
- Family Phoenicopteridae (flamingos)

==== Order Podicipediformes (grebes) ====
- Family Podicipedidae

==== Order Columbiformes (pigeons and doves) ====
- Family Columbidae

==== Order Mesitornithiformes (mesites) ====
- Family Mesitornithidae

==== Order Pterocliformes (sandgrouses) ====
- Family Pteroclidae

==== Order Apodiformes (swifts and hummingbirds) ====
- Family Apodidae (swifts)
- Family Hemiprocnidae (treeswifts)
- Family Trochilidae (hummingbirds)

==== Order Caprimulgiformes (frogmouths, nightjars, and more) ====
- Family Aegothelidae (owlet-nightjar)
- Family Caprimulgidae (potoos)
- Family Nyctibiidae (nightjars)
- Family Podargidae (frogmouth)
- Family Steatornithidae (oilbird)

==== Order Cuculiformes (cuckoos) ====
- Family Cuculidae

==== Order Otidiformes (bustards) ====
- Family Otididae

==== Order Musophagiformes (turacos) ====
- Family Musophagidae

==== Order Opisthocomiformes (hoatzin) ====
- Family Opisthocomidae

==== Order Gruiformes (cranes and relatives) ====
- Family Aptornithidae (adzebills)
- Family Aramidae (limpkin)
- Family Gruidae (cranes)
- Family Heliornithidae (finfoots and sungrebe)
- Family Psophiidae (trumpeters)
- Family Rallidae (rails)
- Family Sarothruridae (flufftails)

==== Order Charadriiformes (waders and gulls) ====
- Suborder Charadrii (plover-like waders)
  - Family Charadriidae (plovers and lapwings)
  - Family Haematopodidae (oystercatchers)
  - Family Ibidorhynchidae (ibisbill)
  - Family Recurvirostridae (avocets and stilts)
- Suborder Chionidi (thick-knees and allies)
  - Family Burhinidae (thick-knees)
  - Family Chionididae (sheathbills)
  - Family Pluvianellidae (Magellanic plover)
- Suborder Lari (gulls and allies)
  - Family Alcidae (puffins, guillemots, murres, and allies)
  - Family Dromadidae (crab plover)
  - Family Glareolidae (pratincoles and coursers)
  - Family Laridae (gulls, terns, and skimmers)
  - Family Pluvianidae (Egyptian plover)
  - Family Stercorariidae (skuas)
- Suborder Scolopaci (snipe-like waders)
  - Family Scolopacidae (snipe, sandpipers, phalaropes, and allies)
- Suborder Thinocori (aberrant charadriforms)
  - Family Jacanidae (jacanas)
  - Family Pedionomidae (plains wanderer)
  - Family Rostratulidae (painted snipe)
  - Family Thinocoridae (seedsnipe)
- Suborder Turnici (buttonquails)
  - Family Turnicidae (buttonquails)

==== Order Gaviiformes (loons) ====
- Family Gaviidae

==== Order Procellariiformes (petrels, including albatrosses and more) ====
- Family Diomedeidae (albatrosses)
- Family Hydrobatidae (storm petrels)
- Family Oceanitidae (austral storm petrels)
- Family Pelecanoididae (diving petrels)
- Family Procellariidae (fulmars, petrels, and shearwaters)

==== Order Sphenisciformes (penguins) ====
- Family Spheniscidae

==== Order Ciconiiformes (storks) ====
- Family Ciconiidae

==== Order Pelecaniformes (boobies, cormorants, darters, and more) ====
- Family Ardeidae (herons)
- Family Balaenicipitidae (shoebill)
- Family Pelecanidae (pelicans)
- Family Threskiornithidae (ibises)

==== Order Eurypygiformes (sunbitterns and kagus) ====
- Family Eurypygidae (sunbitterns)
- Family Rhynochetidae (kagus)

==== Order Phaethontiformes (tropicbirds) ====
- Family Phaethontidae

==== Order Cathartiformes (New World vultures) ====
- Family Cathartidae

==== Order Accipitriformes (birds of prey, such as hawks and eagles) ====
- Family Accipitridae (hawks, eagles, Old World vultures, and more)
- Family Pandionidae (pandion)
- Family Sagittariidae (secretarybird)

==== Order Strigiformes (owls) ====
- Family Strigidae (true owls)
- Family Tytonidae (barn-owls)

==== Order Coliiformes (mousebirds) ====
- Family Coliidae

==== Order Leptosomiformes (cuckoo roller) ====
- Family Leptosomidae

==== Order Trogoniformes (trogons) ====
- Family Trogonidae

==== Order Bucerotiformes (hornbills and hoopoes) ====
- Family Bucerotidae (true hornbills)
- Family Bucorvidae (ground hornbills)
- Family Phoeniculidae (wood hoopoes)
- Family Upupidae (hoopoe)

==== Order Coraciiformes (kingfishers, bee-eaters, and more) ====
- Family Alcedinidae (kingfishers)
- Family Brachypteraciidae (ground-rollers)
- Family Coraciidae (rollers)
- Family Meropidae (bee-eaters)
- Family Momotidae (motmots)
- Family Todidae (todies)

==== Order Piciformes (woodpeckers, puffbirds, barbets, toucans, and relatives) ====
- Suborder Galbuli
  - Family Bucconidae (puffbirds and relatives)
  - Family Galbulidae (jacamars)
- Suborder Pici
  - Family Capitonidae (American barbets)
  - Family Indicatoridae (honeyguides)
  - Family Lybiidae (African barbets)
  - Family Megalaimidae (Asian barbets)
  - Family Picidae (woodpeckers, piculets and wrynecks)
  - Family Ramphastidae (toucans)
  - Family Semnornithidae (toucan-barbets)

==== Order Cariamiformes (seriemas) ====
- Family Cariamidae

==== Order Falconiformes (falcons and caracaras) ====
- Family Falconidae

==== Order Psittaciformes (parrots) ====
- Family Cacatuidae (cockatoos)
- Family Nestoridae (kea and New Zealand kaka)
- Family Psittacidae (various "true" parrots)
- Family Psittaculidae (lovebirds, fig parrots, lories, tiger parrots, pygmy parrots, and more)
- Family Psittrichasiidae (Pesquet's parrot and vasa parrots)
- Family Strigopidae (kākāpō)

==== Order Passeriformes (passerines) ====
- Suborder Acanthisitti
  - Family Acanthisittidae (New Zealand wrens)
- Suborder Passeri (songbirds)
  - Infraorder Climacterides
    - Family Climacteridae (Australian treecreepers)
    - Family Ptilonorhynchidae (bowerbirds)
  - Infraorder Corvides
    - Family Mohouidae (whitehead, yellowhead, and pipipi)
    - Family Pachycephalidae (whistlers)
    - Family Oreoicidae (Australo-Papuan bellbirds)
    - Family Falcunculidae (crested shriketits)
    - Family Psophodidae (quail-thrushers and jewel-babblers)
    - Family Eulacestomidae (wattled ploughbills)
    - Family Neosittidae (sittellas)
    - Family Oriolidae (Old World orioles and figbirds)
    - Family Paramythiidae (painted berrypeckers)
    - Family Psophodidae (whipbirds and wedgebills)
    - Family Vireonidae (vireos)
    - Family Campephagidae (cuckoo-shrikes and trillers)
    - Family Artamidae (woodswallows, butcherbirds, currawongs, and Australian magpie)
    - Family Machaerirhynchidae (boatbills)
    - Family Aegithinidae (ioras)
    - Family Pityriaseidae (Bornean bristlehead)
    - Family Malaconotidae (bushshrikes)
    - Family Platysteiridae (wattle-eyes)
    - Family Vangidae (vangas)
    - Family Dicruridae (drongos)
    - Family Ifritidae (blue-capped ifrit)
    - Family Melampittidae (melampittas)
    - Family Corcoracidae (Australian mudnesters)
    - Family Paradisaeidae (birds-of-paradise)
    - Family Monarchidae (monarch flycatchers)
    - Family Laniidae (shrikes)
    - Family Corvidae (crows, ravens, and jays)
    - Family Colluricinclidae (strike-thrushes)
  - Infraorder Meliphagides
    - Family Maluridae (Australasian wrens)
    - Family Dasyornithidae (bristlebirds)
    - Family Meliphagidae (honeyeaters)
    - Family Pardalotidae (pardalotes)
    - Family Acanthizidae (Australasian warblers)
  - Infraorder Menurides
    - Family Menuridae (lyrebirds)
    - Family Atrichornithidae (scrub-birds)
  - Infraorder Orthonychides
    - Family Orthonychidae (logrunners)
    - Family Pomatostomidae (pseudo-babblers)
  - Infraorder Passerides
    - Family Melanocharitidae (berrypeckers and longbills)
    - Family Cnemophilidae (satinbirds)
    - Family Callaeidae (New Zealand wattlebirds)
    - Family Notiomystidae (stitchbird)
    - Family Petroicidae (Australian robins)
    - Family Picathartidae (rockfowl)
    - Family Chaetopidae (rock-jumpers)
    - Family Eupetidae (Malaysian rail-babbler)
    - Family Stenostiridae (flycatcher-tits)
    - Family Hyliotidae (hyliotas)
    - Family Remizidae (penduline tits)
    - Family Paridae (true tits, chickadees, and relatives)
    - Family Nicatoridae (nicators)
    - Family Panuridae (bearded reedling)
    - Family Alaudidae (larks)
    - Family Macrosphenidae (African warblers)
    - Family Cisticolidae (cisticolas)
    - Family Acrocephalidae (marsh-warblers and tree-warblers)
    - Family Pnoepygidae (pygmy wren-warblers)
    - Family Locustellidae (grass-warblers)
    - Family Donacobiidae (black-capped donacobius)
    - Family Bernieridae (Malagasy warblers)
    - Family Hirundinidae (swallows and martins)
    - Family Pycnonotidae (bulbuls)
    - Family Phylloscopidae (leaf-warblers)
    - Family Cettiidae (ground-warblers)
    - Family Hyliidae (hylas)
    - Family Aegithalidae (long-tailed tits)
    - Family Sylviidae (typical warblers, parrotbills, and relatives)
    - Family Zosteropidae (white-eyes)
    - Family Timaliidae (tree babblers)
    - Family Pellorneidae (ground babblers)
    - Family Leiothrichidae (laughingthrushes)
    - Family Regulidae (kinglets)
    - Family Elachuridae (spotte elachura)
    - Family Ptiliogonatidae (silky flycatchers)
    - Family Bombycillidae (waxwings)
    - Family Dulidae (palmchat)
    - Family Hypocoliidae (hypocolius)
    - Family Tichodromadidae (wallcreeper)
    - Family Sittidae (nuthatches)
    - Family Certhiidae (treecreepers)
    - Family Salpornithidae (spotted creepers)
    - Family Troglodytidae (New World wrens)
    - Family Polioptilidae (gnatcatchers)
    - Family Cinclidae (dippers)
    - Family Turdidae ("true" thrushes)
    - Family Muscicapidae (Old World flycatchers and chats)
    - Family Buphagidae (oxpeckers)
    - Family Sturnidae (starlings)
    - Family Mimidae (mockingbirds and thrashers)
    - Family Promeropidae (sugarbirds)
    - Family Arcanatoridae (spot-throat, dapple-throat, and grey-chested babbler)
    - Family Dicaeidae (flowerpeckers)
    - Family Nectariniidae (sunbirds)
    - Family Chloropseidae (leafbirds)
    - Family Irenidae (fairy-bluebirds)
    - Family Urocynchramidae (Przewalski's finch)
    - Family Peucedramidae (olive warbler)
    - Family Prunellidae (accentors)
    - Family Ploceidae (weavers)
    - Family Viduidae (indigobirds and whydahs)
    - Family Estrildidae (estrildid finch)
    - Family Passeridae (true sparrows)
    - Family Motacillidae (wagtails and pipits)
    - Family Fringillidae (true finches)
    - Family Calcariidae (longspurs and snow buntings)
    - Family Emberizidae (buntings)
    - Family Passerellidae (American sparrows)
    - Family Icteridae (icterids, such as New World blackbirds)
    - Family Parulidae (New World warblers)
    - Family Thraupidae (tanagers)
    - Family Cardinalidae (cardinals)
    - Family Scotocercidae (streaked scrub warbler)
    - Family Rhagologidae (mottled whistler)
    - Family Prionopidae (helmetshrikes and woodshrikes)
- Suborder Tyranni (suboscines)
  - Family Pittidae (pittas)
  - Family Eurylaimidae (broadbills)
  - Family Philepittidae (asities)
  - Family Sapayoidae (broad-billed sapayoa)
  - Family Pipridae (manakins)
  - Family Cotingidae (cotingas)
  - Family Tityridae (tityras)
  - Family Oxyruncidae (sharpbills)
  - Family Onychorhynchidae (royal flycatchers and relatives)
  - Family Pipritidae (piprites)
  - Family Platyrinchidae (spadebills)
  - Family Tachurididae (many-colored rush tyrants)
  - Family Rhynchocyclidae (mionectine flycatchers)
  - Family Tyrannidae (tyrant flycatchers)
  - Family Melanopareiidae (crescentchests)
  - Family Thamnophilidae (antbirds)
  - Family Conopophagidae (gnateaters and gnatpittas)
  - Family Grallariidae (antpittas)
  - Family Rhinocryptidae (typical tapaculos)
  - Family Formicariidae (antthrushes)
  - Family Furnariidae (ovenbirds and woodcreepers)

=== Superorder Notopalaeognathae ===
==== Order Rheiformes ====
- Family Rheidae

==== Order Tinamiformes ====
- Family Tinamidae (tinamou)

==== Order Casuariiformes ====
- Family Casuariidae (cassowaries)
- Family Dromaiidae (emu)

==== Order Apterygiformes ====
- Family Apterygidae (kiwi)

=== Other ===
==== Order Struthioniformes ====
- Family Struthionidae (ostriches)

== Mammalia ==
=== Group Prototheria (monotremes) ===
==== Order Monotremata ====
- Family Ornithorhynchidae (platypus)
- Family Tachyglossidae (echidnas)

=== Group Marsupialia (marsupials) ===
==== Order Dasyuromorphia (marsupial mice and numbat) ====
- Family Dasyuridae (marsupial mice)
- Family Myrmecobiidae (numbat)

==== Order Didelphimorphia (opossums) ====
- Family Didelphidae

==== Order Diprotodontia (koalas, wombats, kangaroos, and more) ====
- Suborder Macropodiformes (kangaroos, wallabies, bettongs, and more)
  - Family Hypsiprymnodontidae (rat kangaroos)
  - Family Macropodidae (kangaroos, wallabies, and wallaroos)
  - Family Potoroidae (bettongs and potoroos)
- Suborder Phalangeriformes (possums, gliders, and cuscus)
  - Family Acrobatidae (feathertail glider and feather-tailed possum)
  - Family Burramyidae (pygmy possums)
  - Family Petauridae (striped possum, trioks, gliders, and leadbeater's possum)
  - Family Phalangeridae (cuscuses and brushtail possums)
  - Family Pseudocheiridae (ringtailed possums)
  - Family Tarsipedidae (honey possum)
- Suborder Vombatiformes (koala, wombats, and multiple extinct species)
  - Family Phascolarctidae (koala)
  - Family Vombatidae (wombats)

==== Order Microbiotheria (monito del monte) ====
- Family Microbiotheriidae

==== Order Notoryctemorphia (marsupial moles) ====
- Family Notoryctidae

==== Order Paucituberculata (shrew opossums) ====
- Family Caenolestidae

==== Order Peramelemorphia (marsupial omnivores) ====
- Family Thylacomyidae (bilbies)
- Family Peramelidae (bandicoots)

=== Group Placentalia (placental mammals) ===
==== Order Afrosoricida (golden moles and tenrecs) ====
- Family Chrysochloridae (golden moles)
- Family Tenrecidae (tenrecs)

==== Order Carnivora (carnivorans, such as dogs, cats, and relatives) ====
- Suborder Feliformia (cat-like carnivorans and relatives)
  - Family Nandiniidae (African palm civet)
  - Family Prionodontidae (Asiatic linsangs)
  - Family Felidae (domestic cats, leopards, lynxes, tigers, lions, cougars, and cat relatives)
  - Family Viverridae (civets, African linsangs, and genets)
  - Family Hyaenidae (hyenas and aardwolf)
  - Family Eupleridae (Malagasy carnivorans)
  - Family Herpestidae (mongooses)
- Suborder Caniformia (dog-like carnivorans and relatives)
  - Family Canidae (domestic dogs, foxes, wolves, jackals, and relatives)
  - Family Ursidae (bears and giant panda)
  - Family Odobenidae (walrus)
  - Family Otariidae (eared seals)
  - Family Phocidae (true seals)
  - Family Ailuridae (red panda)
  - Family Mephitidae (skunks and stink badgers)
  - Family Mustelidae (weasels and relatives)
  - Family Procyonidae (raccoons, coatis, olingos, ringtail cats, and relatives)

==== Order Cetartiodactyla (even-toed ungulates) ====
- Suborder Ruminantia
      - Family Tragulidae (chevrotain)
      - Family Moschidae (musk deer)
      - Family Cervidae (deer)
      - Family Bovidae (hollow-horned ungulates)
      - Family Antilocapridae (pronghorn)
      - Family Giraffidae (giraffe and okapi)
- Suborder Suina
      - Family Suidae (pigs)
      - Family Tayassuidae (peccaries)
- Suborder Tylopoda
      - Family Camelidae (camels and relatives)
- Suborder Whippomorpha
      - Family Hippopotamidae (hippopotamuses)
  - Infraorder Cetacea
    - Parvorder Mysticeti (Baleen whales)
      - Family Balaenidae (right and bowhead whales)
      - Family Cetotheriidae (pygmy right whales)
      - Family Eschrichtiidae (gray whales)
      - Family Balaenopteridae (rorquals)
    - Parvorder Odontoceti (Toothed whales)
      - Family Physeteridae (sperm whale)
      - Family Kogiidae (pygmy and dwarf sperm whales)
      - Family Ziphiidae (beaked whales)
      - Family Platanistidae (South Asian river dolphin)
      - Family Iniidae (Amazon river dolphins)
      - Family Lipotidae (baiji)
      - Family Pontoporiidae (franciscana)
      - Family Monodontidae (narwhal and beluga)
      - Family Delphinidae (oceanic dolphins)
      - Family Phocoenidae (porpoises)

==== Order Chiroptera (bats) ====
- Suborder Yangochiroptera
  - Family Emballonuridae (sac-winged bats)
  - Family Furipteridae
  - Family Molossidae (free-tailed bats)
  - Family Mormoopidae
  - Family Mystacinidae (New Zealand short-tailed bats)
  - Family Myzopodidae (sucker-footed bats)
  - Family Natalidae (funnel-eared bats)
  - Family Noctilionidae (bulldog bats)
  - Family Nycteridae (hollow-faced bats)
  - Family Phyllostomidae (leaf-nosed bats)
  - Family Thyropteridae (disk-winged bats)
  - Family Vespertilionidae (vesper bats)
- Suborder Yinpterochiroptera
  - Family Craseonycteridae (Kitti's hog-nosed bat (also known as the bumblebee bat))
  - Family Hipposideridae (Old World leaf-nosed bats)
  - Family Megadermatidae (false vampire bats)
  - Family Pteropodidae (megabats)
  - Family Rhinolophidae (horseshoe bats)
  - Family Rhinopomatidae (mouse-tailed bats)

==== Order Cingulata (armadillos) ====
- Family Chlamyphoridae (fairy armadillos, giant armadillos, and more)
- Family Dasypodidae

==== Order Dermoptera (colugos) ====
- Family Cynocephalidae (colugos, or flying lemurs)

==== Order Eulipotyphla (hedgehogs, shrews, and moles) ====
- Family Erinaceidae (Hedgehog)
- Family Soricidae (Shrew)
- Family Talpidae (Mole)
- Family Solenodontidae

==== Order Hyracoidea (hyraxes) ====
- Family Procaviidae

==== Order Lagomorpha (rabbits, hares, and pikas) ====
- Family Leporidae (rabbits and hares)
- Family Ochotonidae (pikas)

==== Order Macroscelidea (elephant shrews) ====
- Family Macroscelididae (Elephant shrew)

==== Order Perissodactyla (odd-toed ungulates) ====
- Suborder Hippomorpha
  - Family Equidae (horses and relatives)
- Suborder Ceratomorpha
  - Family Rhinocerotidae (rhinoceros)
  - Family Tapiridae (tapirs)

==== Order Pholidota (pangolins) ====
- Family Manidae (Pangolin)

==== Order Pilosa (anteaters and sloths) ====
- Suborder Vermilingua
  - Family Cyclopedidae (Silky anteater)
  - Family Myrmecophagidae
- Suborder Folivora
  - Family Bradypodidae (three-toed sloths)
  - Family Megalonychidae (two-toed sloths)

==== Order Primates (primates, such as monkeys and apes) ====
- Suborder Haplorhini
  - Infraorder Simiiformes
    - Parvorder Catarrhini (Old world monkey)
      - Superfamily Cercopithecoidea
        - Family Cercopithecidae
      - Superfamily Hominoidea
        - Family Hominidae (great apes)
        - Family Hylobatidae (lesser apes)
    - Parvorder Platyrrhini (New world monkey)
        - Family Aotidae
        - Family Atelidae
        - Family Callitrichidae
        - Family Cebidae
        - Family Pitheciidae
  - Infraorder Tarsiiformes
        - Family Tarsiidae
- Suborder Strepsirrhini
  - Infraorder Lemuriformes
      - Superfamily Lemuroidea (lemurs and relatives)
        - Family Cheirogaleidae
        - Family Daubentoniidae
        - Family Indriidae
        - Family Lemuridae
        - Family Lepilemuridae
      - Superfamily Lorisoidea
        - Family Galagidae (bushbaby and galago)
        - Family Lorisidae (loris and potto)

==== Order Proboscidea (elephants) ====
- Family Elephantidae

==== Order Rodentia (rodents) ====
- Suborder Anomaluromorpha ("Anomalure-like animals")
  - Family Anomaluridae (African scaly-tailed flying squirrels)
  - Family Pedetidae (Springhares)
- Suborder Castorimorpha ("Beaver-like animals")
  - Family Castoridae (beavers)
  - Family Geomyidae (Pocket gophers)
  - Family Heteromyidae (Pocket mouses)
- Suborder Hystricomorpha ("Porcupine-like animals")
  - Infraorder Hystricognathi ("Porcupine-like jaws")
    - Parvorder Caviomorpha (New World hystricognaths)
      - Family Caviidae (guinea pigs, cavies, maras, and capybaras)
      - Family Cuniculidae (Pacas)
      - Family Dasyproctidae (agoutis and acouchis)
      - Family Abrocomidae (Chinchilla rat)
      - Family Chinchillidae (chinchillas and viscachas)
      - Family Dinomyidae (pacaranas)
      - Family Capromyidae (Hutias)
      - Family Ctenomyidae (Tuco-tucos)
      - Family Echimyidae (Neotropical spiny rats)
      - Family Octodontidae (rock rats, degus, coruro, and viscacha rats)
      - Family Heterocephalidae (Naked mole-rats)
    - Parvorder Phiomorpha ("forms from Fayum")
      - Family Thryonomyidae (cane rats)
      - Family Bathyergidae (Mole-rats)
      - Family Petromuridae (Dassie rats)
  - Infraorder Unknown
    - Parvorder Unknown
      - Family Ctenodactylidae (Gundis)
      - Family Diatomyidae (Laotian rock rats)
      - Family Hystricidae (Old World porcupines)
- Suborder Myomorpha ("Mouse-like animals")
  - Superfamily Muroidea ("related to mice")
    - Family Calomyscidae (Mouse-like hamsters and brush-tailed mice)
    - Family Cricetidae (true hamsters, voles, lemmings, muskrats, New World rats, and New World mice)
    - Family Muridae (True mice, including Old World rats, Old World mice, and allies)
    - Family Nesomyidae (Malagasy rodents, climbing mice, African rock mice, swamp mice, pouched rats, and white-tailed rats)
    - Family Platacanthomyidae (False dormice)
    - Family Spalacidae (mole-rats, blind mole-rats, bamboo rats, and zokors)
  - Superfamily Dipodoidea ("Two-footed / bipedal")
    - Family Dipodidae (Jerboas and Jumping mice)
- Suborder Sciuromorpha ("Squirrel-like animals")
  - Family Aplodontiidae (mountain beaver)
  - Family Gliridae (True dormice)
  - Family Sciuridae (flying squirrels, tree squirrels, and ground squirrels—including chipmunks and prairie dogs)

==== Order Scandentia (treeshrews) ====
- Family Ptilocercidae (pen-tailed treeshrews)
- Family Tupaiidae (True treeshrews)

==== Order Sirenia (sea cows) ====
- Family Dugongidae (dugongs and sea cows)
- Family Trichechidae (manatees)

==== Order Tubulidentata (aardvarks) ====
- Family Orycteropodidae (aardvarks)
