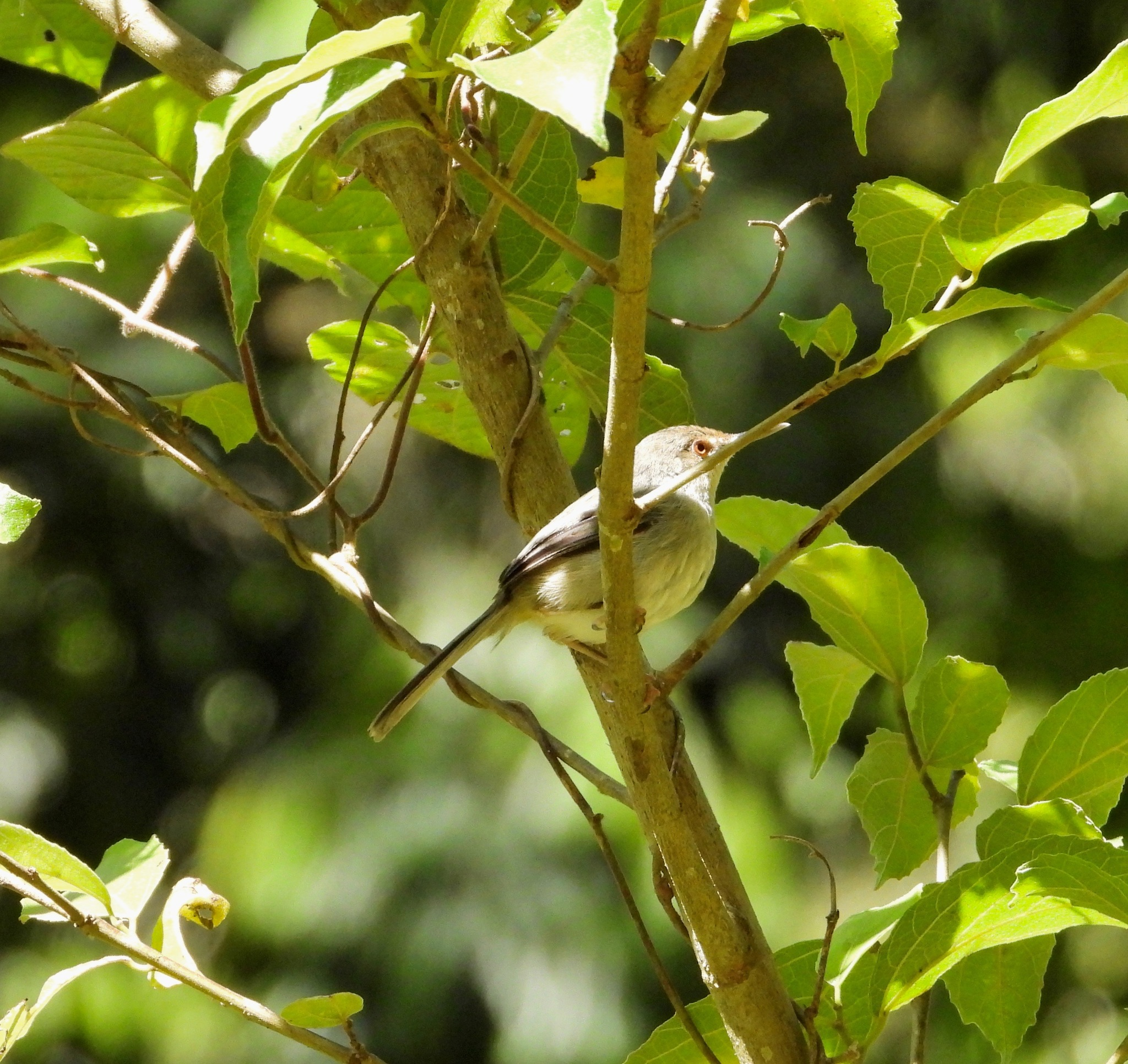

Conservation status
- Critically Endangered (IUCN 3.1)

Scientific classification
- Kingdom: Animalia
- Phylum: Chordata
- Class: Aves
- Order: Passeriformes
- Family: Cisticolidae
- Genus: Artisornis
- Species: A. moreaui

Binomial name
- Artisornis moreaui (Sclater, WL, 1931)

Synonyms
- Apalis moreaui (Sclater, 1931); Orthotomus moreaui (Sclater, 1931); Artisornis sousae (del Hoyo and Collar, 2016)

Audio

= Long-billed forest warbler =

Species of bird

The long-billed forest warbler (Artisornis moreaui), also known as the long-billed tailorbird, is a songbird of the family Cisticolidae, formerly part of the "Old World warbler" assemblage. It is found in Tanzania and Mozambique. Its natural habitat is subtropical or tropical moist montane forests. It is threatened by habitat destruction.

== Taxonomy ==
The long-billed forest warbler was formally described in 1931 by the British zoologist William Lutley Sclater from specimens collected by Reginald Ernest Moreau in forest near Amani in the Usambara Mountains of eastern Tanzania. Sclater coined the binomial name Apalis moreaui with the specific epithet chosen to honour the collector. This warbler is now placed with the red-capped forest warbler in the genus Artisornis that was introduced in 1928 by the American ornithologist Herbert Friedmann.

Two subspecies are recognised:

- A. m. moreaui (Sclater, WL, 1931) – northeast Tanzania
- A. m. sousae (Benson, 1945) – northwest Mozambique

Some taxonomists treat A. m. sousae as a separate species, the Mozambique forest warbler.

== Description ==
The long-billed forest warbler is a small, plump, inconspicuous warbler, growing to a length of about 10 cm (4 in). The upper parts are greyish and the underparts a rather paler grey. The head sometimes has a brownish tinge, and bears filoplumes. The beak is long and slender, and the tail is long and is frequently cocked when the bird is excited. The call is a distinctive metallic "peedoo peedoo"; this bird is easier to detect by hearing its call than by sight. It is similar in appearance to the red-capped forest warbler (Artisornis metopias), but that species has a much shorter beak, a more russet head and a rust-washed breast.

== Distribution and habitat ==
Subspecies moreaui is endemic to the East Usambara plateau in Tanzania. In the Usamabaras it is present in the Amani Nature Reserve and the Nilo Nature Reserve. The East Usambara plateau is known as a biodiversity hotspot and has many endemic species.

The Mozambique forest warbler (Artisornis moreaui sousae) is endemic to the Njesi Highlands of northern Mozambique. Its natural habitat is evergreen Afromontane forest patches and riparian forests. It has been observed between 1,430 and 1,850 meters elevation on the three highest mountains – the Njesi Plateau, Mount Chitagal, and Mount Sanga – in the highlands. It was found in the mid-storey and canopy (never the understorey), particularly around forest gaps and tree falls, forest clearings, and dense vine tangles.

== Status ==
A. moreaui moreaui has a small total area of occurrence which is estimated to be approximately 950 km^{2} (367 mi^{2}). It is an uncommon, and elusive species occurring at a low density, and the total number of mature birds is estimated to be thirty to two hundred. On this basis, the International Union for Conservation of Nature has assessed its conservation status as being "critically endangered"; however if its range turns out to be more extensive than is currently recognised, its rating is likely to be lowered to a less threatened category.

The total population of the Mozambique forest warbler is conservatively estimated to include 50-249 mature individuals, but may be more numerous, and is considered stable. It is classified as endangered based on its small population and limited range.

In 1945 the British ornithologist Constantine Benson identified a second population from bird skins collected by Jali Makawa in the Njesi Highlands of northern Mozambique. Benson classified the Mozambique birds as a subspecies of the long-billed forest warbler, Apalis moreaui sousae. The Njesi Highlands and Usambara Plateau are separated by 1,000 km (621 mi) and the bird is not known to occur in the intervening area. The Mozambique race is now sometimes treated as a separate species, the Mozambique forest warbler.
