= Jali Makawa =

Jali Makawa (c. 1914 – 1995) was a Mozambique-born bird expert who assisted the British ornithologist C.W. "Con" Benson. He also worked with other ornithologists and collectors in east Africa including Melvin Traylor, Arthur Loveridge, Charles Sibley, and Michael Irwin. Makawa was famed for his observational skills, ability to identify novel species, mimic bird calls, collect, and prepare specimens. Several subspecies and a species of bird that he collected have been named after him.

== Life and work ==
Makawa was born in Mozambique and belonged to the ethnic group variously known as Lomwe, Nguru, or Makua who traditionally hunted for food. Known for their skills in the field, the Makua people became famous as trackers for western elephant hunters. The family had emigrated from Mozambique during World War I and moved to Nyasaland (now Malawi). In 1932 he became an assistant to the cook of the colonial official Constantine Walter Benson who was also a keen naturalist. In 1934, Benson was accompanied by Makawa on an ornithological field trip and when Benson failed to capture a specimen of an Abyssinian Slaty Flycatcher and gave up, Makawa was able to demonstrate his skill by obtaining a specimen at the end of the last day at the site. After Benson left in 1962, Makawa worked in the Zambian Game department and accompanied ornithological visitors to the Lochinvar National Park. He became a Zambian citizen by registration in 1967. In 1972, he retired from Lochinvar and became an assistant to Robert J. Dowsett at the Livingstone Museum. Makawa was known for his acute observation and ability to distinguish minute differences. In 1964, Michael Irwin showed him a specimen of a bird that he thought was a thrush nightingale (Luscinia luscinia) but Makawa who had collected many specimens of that species declared that he had never collected anything like it. Irwin later discovered that it was in fact a river warbler, Locustella fluviatilis. In 1977, Dowsett arranged for Makawa to live in Muckleneuk, on the Choma farm of the Bruce-Miller family. He continued to help Benson, assisting him with information in the production of the Birds of Malawi. While Benson wrote and believed that Makawa had a deep interest in birds, some of his fellow ornithologists claimed that Makawa was only motivated by the opportunity to travel and impress women.

=== Contribution to ornithology ===
Makawa collected in Ethiopia, Rhodesia, Mozambique and Madagascar. With Benson he collected nearly 2,400 specimens in Ethiopia. Together they discovered Hirundo megaensis and Oreophilais robertsi. With support from the Portuguese official A. Baptista de Sousa, Benson and Makawa visited Njesi Highlands where they identified a new subspecies of Apalis moreaui sousae, a species then known only from the Usambara mountains. In 1958 Benson led an expedition in the Indian Ocean and along with Makawa they discovered a new species of warbler on the Comoros, Nesillas mariae. Makawa collected a specimen of a tinkerbird that was new to him and when it failed to match any known species, it was formally described in 1965 by Benson and Irwin as Pogoniulus makawai. The single specimen with unique plumage has been examined in more recent times and comparison of its DNA sequences with related species suggests that it may represent a distinct population (or subspecies) of Pogoniulus bilineatus. In 1972 he accompanied John Colebrook-Robject to Madagascar to join an expedition headed by Charles Sibley. Part of the work involved collecting the albumen of eggs of wild birds, which Sibley later used in his work on the classification of passerines. Melvin Traylor described and named a subspecies Calandrella conirostris makawai after Makawa in 1962. Other subspecies named after him include Malaconotus olivaceus makawa from Malawi. Coracopsis rasa makawa from the Comoros. Makawa was known for his ability to remember and distinguish bird calls and songs. He assisted Keith and Benson in their studies of elusive Madagascar rails in the genus Sarothrura. Makawa would imitate calls and lure male rails, allowing the birds to approach and allowed their own calls to be recorded. Makawa was known as an assiduous field assistant, sometimes even sleeping out at the field site to get a first chance to see a bird at dawn.

== Later life ==
Makawa's relatively high status and wealth made many jealous and he had a troubled relationship with his son. In 1988 a neighbour accused him of witchcraft and around 1990 he is thought to have moved to Lusaka to live with his daughter. Little is known of his later life and death.
