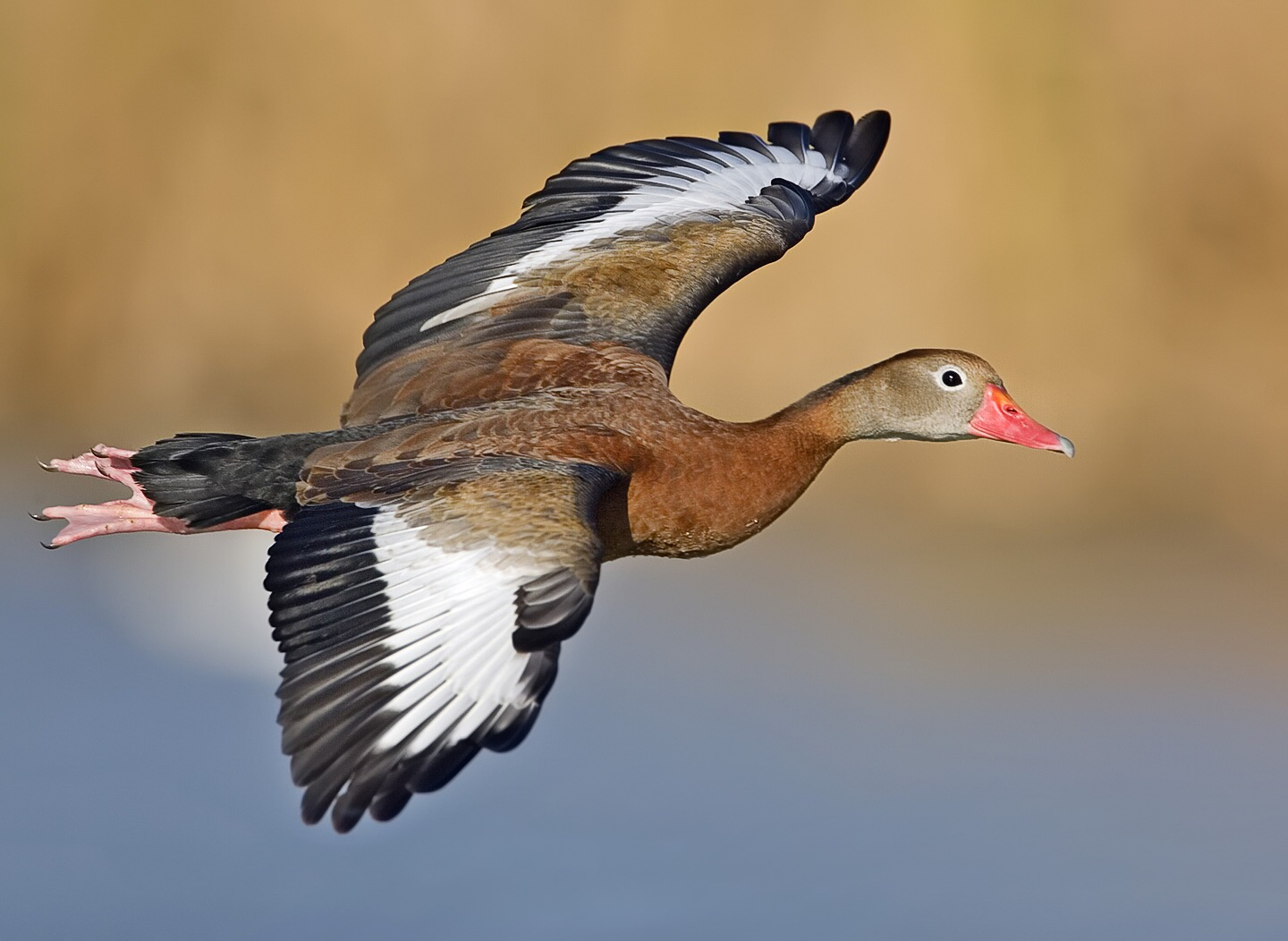
- Northern subspecies (D. a. fulgens, note brown breast). The white wing patch, a tell-tale feature of this species, is conspicuous in flight.

Conservation status
- Least Concern (IUCN 3.1)
- CITES Appendix III

Scientific classification
- Kingdom: Animalia
- Phylum: Chordata
- Class: Aves
- Order: Anseriformes
- Family: Anatidae
- Genus: Dendrocygna
- Species: D. autumnalis

Binomial name
- Dendrocygna autumnalis (Linnaeus, 1758)

Subspecies
- D. a. autumnalis (Linnaeus, 1758); D. a. fulgens (Friedmann, 1947)
- Range of D. autumnalis

Synonyms
- Anas autumnalis Linnaeus, 1758 Dendrocygna fallalis Gosler, 1991

= Black-bellied whistling duck =

Species of bird

The black-bellied whistling duck (Dendrocygna autumnalis) or black-bellied tree duck, is a whistling duck that before 2000 bred mainly from the southernmost United States to south-central South America. It can be found year-round in much of the United States. It has been recorded in every eastern state and adjacent Canadian province. Since it is one of only two whistling duck species native to North America, it is occasionally just known as the "whistling duck" or "Mexican squealer" in the southern USA.

== Taxonomy ==
In 1751 the English naturalist George Edwards included an illustration and a description of the black-bellied whistling duck in the fourth volume of his A Natural History of Uncommon Birds. He used the English name "The red-billed whistling duck". Edwards based his hand-coloured etching on a live bird kept at the home of Admiral Charles Wager in Chelsea, London. Edwards was told that the bird had come from the West Indies. When in 1758 the Swedish naturalist Carl Linnaeus updated his Systema Naturae for the tenth edition, he placed the black-bellied whistling duck with the ducks, geese and swans in the genus Anas. Linnaeus included a brief description, coined the binomial name Anas autumnalis, and cited Edwards' work. The black-bellied whistling duck is now placed in the genus Dendrocygna that was introduced in 1837 by the English naturalist William Swainson to distinguish whistling ducks from other waterfowl. The genus name combines the Ancient Greek dendron meaning "tree" with the genus Cygnus containing the swans that was introduced by François Alexandre Pierre de Garsault in 1764. The specific epithet autumnalis is Latin meaning "autumnal".

Two subspecies are recognised. They intergrade in Panama.

- D. a. fulgens Friedmann, 1947 – southeast Texas to Panama

Larger, with a brown breast and upper back.

- D. a. autumnalis (Linnaeus, 1758) – Panama to Ecuador and northern Argentina

Smaller, with gray breast and upper back.

Prior to 1978, birds from western Panama north to the southern USA were erroneously referred to as D. a. autumnalis and birds from eastern Panama into South America were referred to as D. a. discolor.

== Description ==
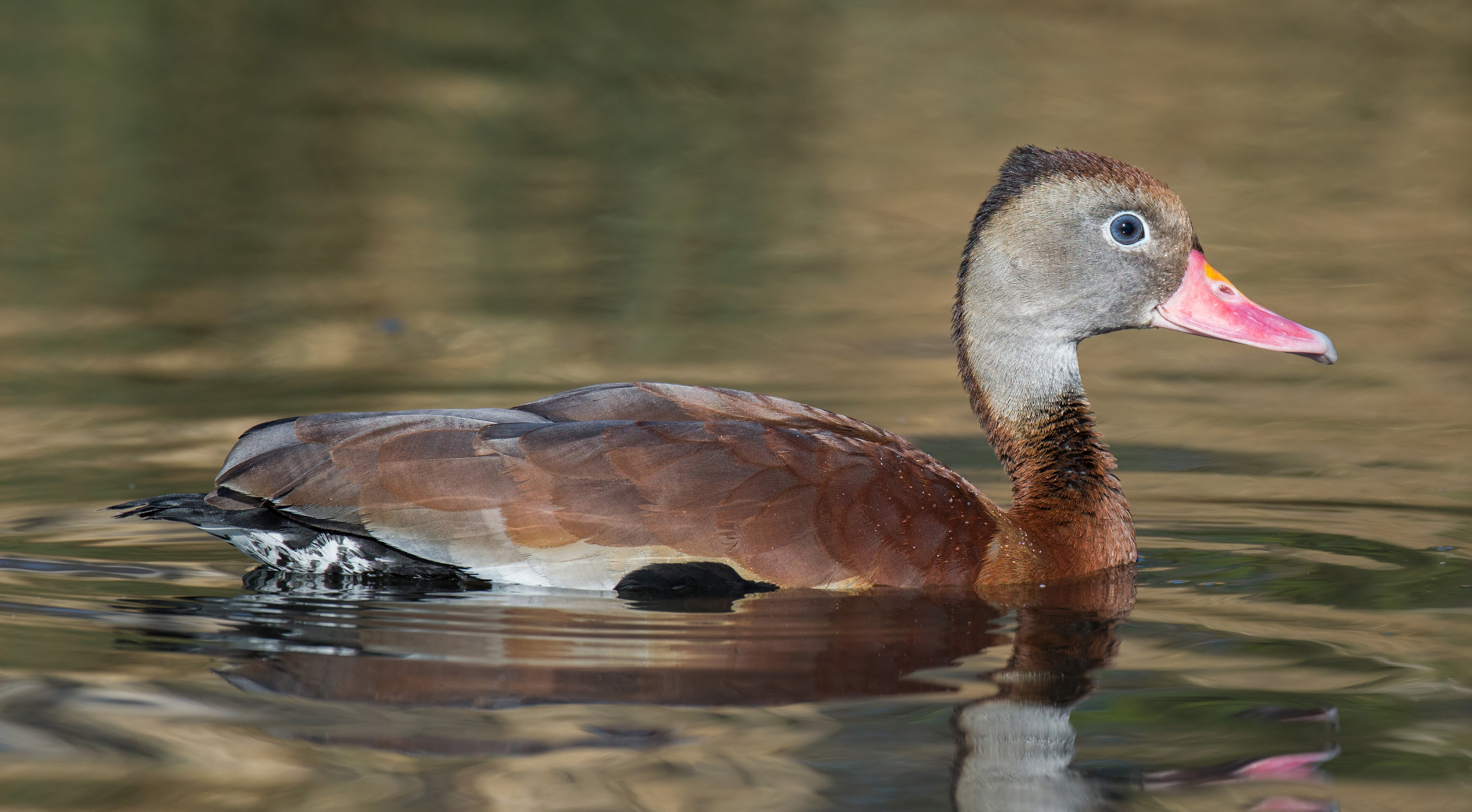
A black-bellied whistling duck in the water

The black-bellied whistling duck is a mid-sized waterfowl species. Length ranges from 47 to 56 cm (19 to 22 in), body mass from 652 to 1,020 g (1.437 to 2.249 lb), and wingspan ranges from 76 to 94 cm (30 to 37 in). It has a long pink bill, long head and longish legs, pale gray head and mostly gray-brown plumage. The belly and tail are black, and the body plumage, back of the neck and cap are a rich chestnut brown. The face and upper neck are gray, and they sport a thin but distinct white eye-ring. The extensive white in the wings is obvious in flight, less so on the ground; it is formed by the secondary remiges while the primaries are black; the wing coverts are brown. Males and females look alike; juveniles are similar but have a gray bill and less contrasting belly.

The wing bar is unique among whistling ducks. When on the ground, it may be hard to discern the light flanks present in many of these waterfowl. The fulvous whistling duck (D. bicolor) is the only sympatric whistling duck that shows such a whitish flank stripe, and it differs from the black-bellied by having dark wings and a lighter belly rather than the other way around. Juvenile D. autumnalis are quite similar to the young of the white-faced whistling duck (D. viduata), which have a darker bill and no white wing patch; even when sitting they never seem to show white along the sides, as their thin white vertical barring on the black flanks is very indistinct.

As the name implies, these are noisy birds with a clear whistling waa-chooo call.

== Distribution and habitat ==
The species is widely distributed in the American continent, to the north it includes the southern part of the United States (Texas, Arizona and Louisiana) and Mexico (mainly along the Pacific and Atlantic slopes, Yucatan Peninsula, southern Mexico and Baja California). Its distribution continues to Central and South America, including Venezuela, Colombia, Ecuador and Peru.

The black-bellied whistling duck is generally not strongly migratory, although they are listed on the List of Birds protected by the Migratory Bird Treaty Act (MBTA). At the heart of their range, there is a tendency to travel in flocks over the winter months, though this behavior is not a true long-range migration but rather local dispersal.

In the 21st century, small numbers have been observed nesting in the Midwestern U.S., including Ohio, Missouri, Illinois, Indiana, and Wisconsin; the species has also strayed to the eastern U.S. and Canada.

== Behavior and ecology ==
The black-bellied whistling duck is a common species that is "quite tame, even in the wild". It is highly gregarious, or social, forming large flocks when not breeding, and is largely resident apart from local movements. It usually nests in hollow trees (in South America many times in palm trees). The habitat is quite shallow freshwater ponds, lakes, and marshes, cultivated land or reservoirs with plentiful vegetation, where this duck feeds mainly at night on seeds and other plant food.

=== Breeding ===
The black-bellied whistling duck is quite unique among ducks in their strong monogamous pair-bond. Its pairs often stay together for many years, a trait more often associated with geese and swans. Both parents share all tasks associated with the raising of the young, from incubation to the rearing of ducklings. The ducks, primarily cavity nesters, prefer the confines of a hollow tree but will nest on the ground when necessary. They also make use of chimneys, abandoned buildings, or nest boxes, the latter having been increasingly provided to them over recent decades, especially in southeast Texas and Mexico.

Each clutch consists of 9 to 18 white eggs, measuring 4.5–6.2 cm (1.8–2.4 in) in length and 3–4.2 cm (1.2–1.6 in) in width.

Ducklings leap from nest cavities within two days of hatching, can feed themselves immediately, and stay with the parents for up to eight weeks.

=== Food and feeding ===
Feeding often occurs nocturnally, but they can be encountered eating at any hour of the day. Black-bellied whistling ducks ingest a wide variety of plant material (including corn, rice, millets, several types of weeds, and other grasses), but also consume arthropods (such as insects and spiders), aquatic invertebrates (such as snails and other molluscs) and tadpoles when available. They often feed on submerged vegetation by wading through shallow water. As its Latin name (autumnalis) implies, it is commonly seen gleaning recently harvested fields for leftover seeds and invertebrates brought up by the harvesters disturbing the soil.

== Status and conservation ==
The black-bellied whistling duck is listed as a species of least concern by the International Union for Conservation of Nature (IUCN); its global population is estimated at 1,100,000–2,000,000 birds and increasing. It is listed as an Appendix III species in the Convention on International Trade in Endangered Species of Wild Fauna and Flora (CITES) at the request of Honduras.

== Gallery ==
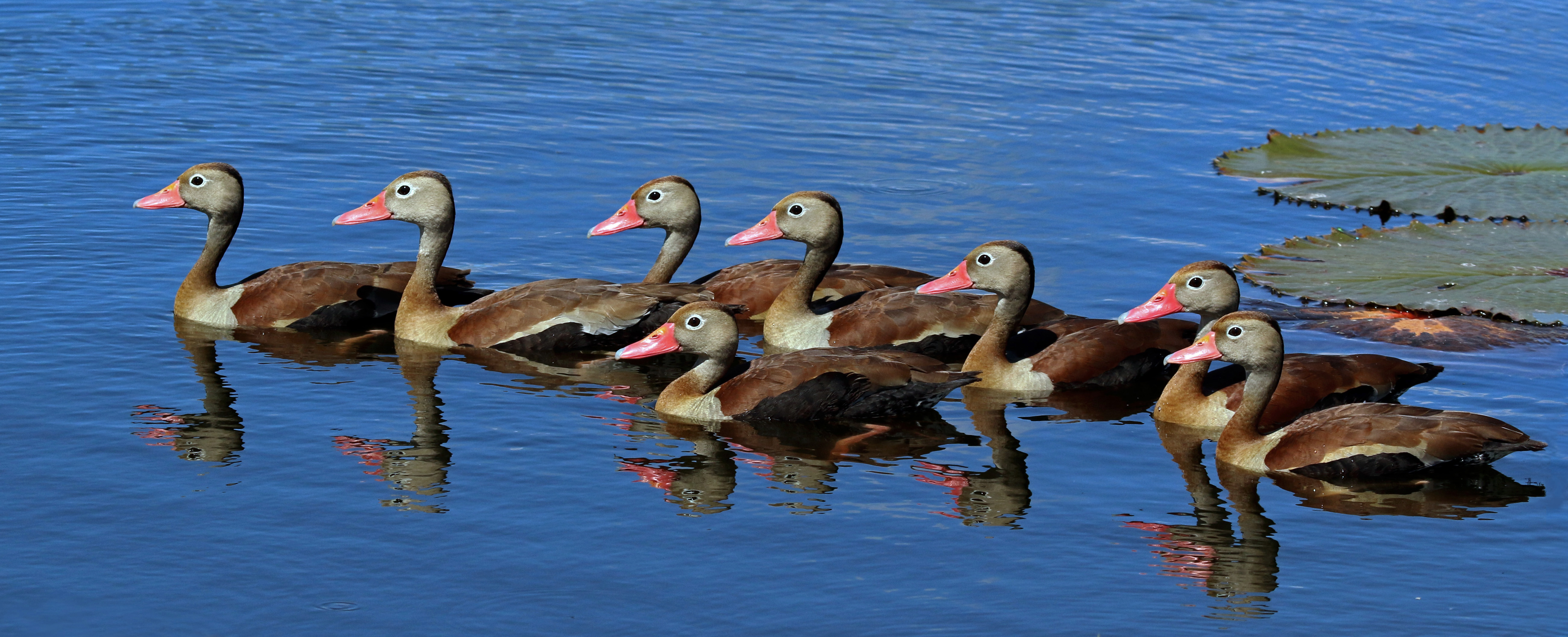
In Tobago

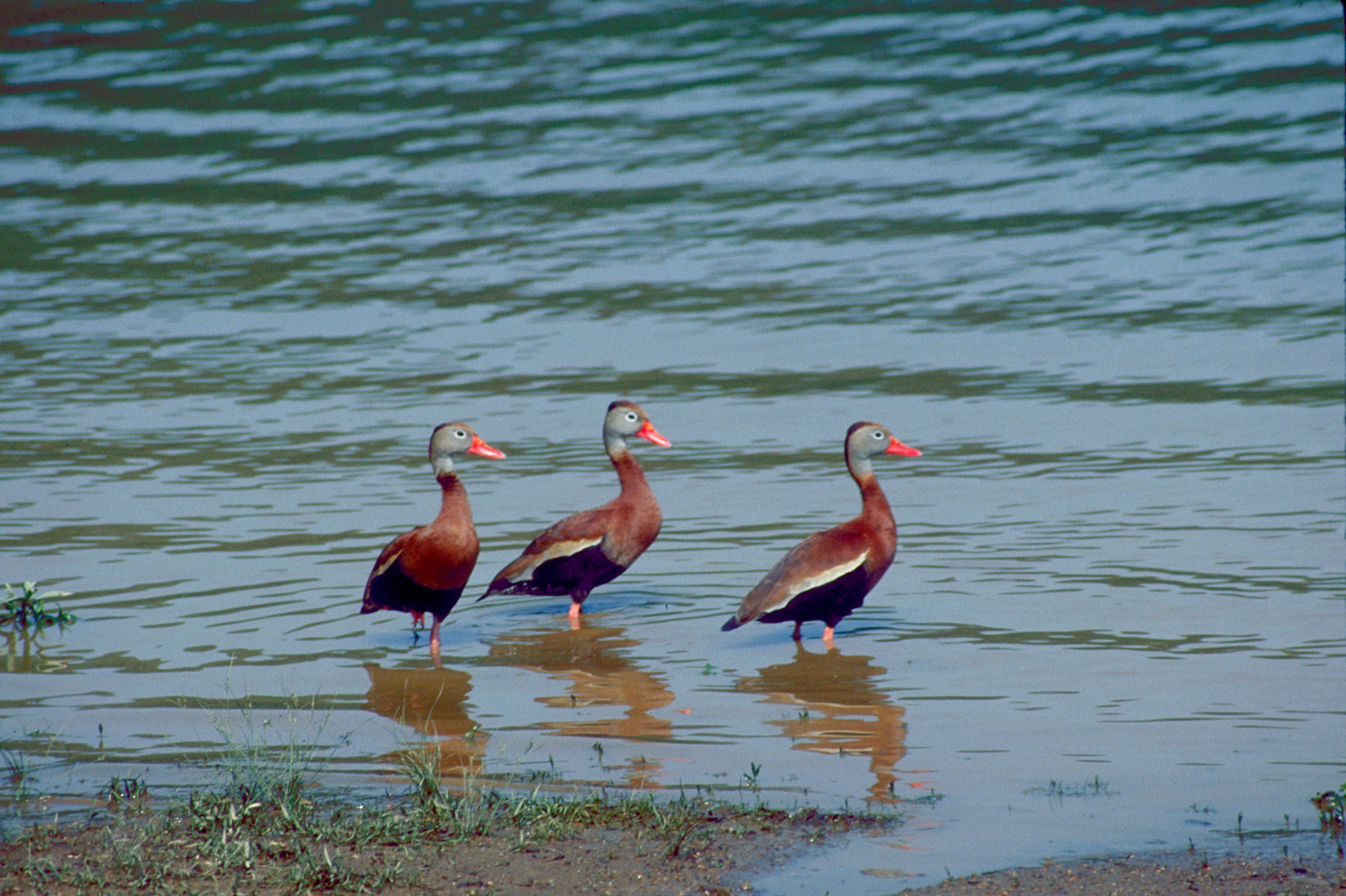
Black-bellied whistling ducks near Saltsburg in Pennsylvania.

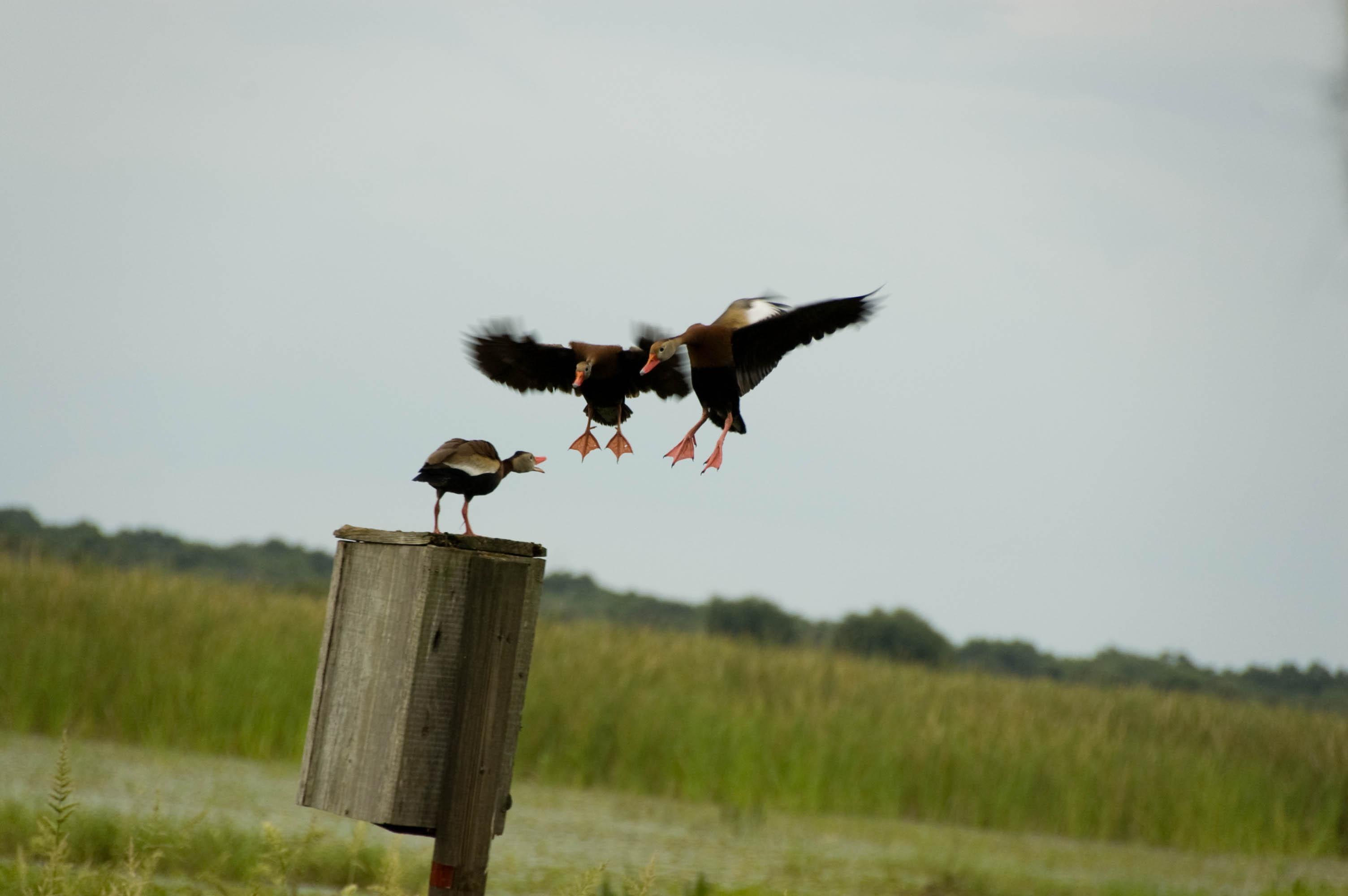
Black-bellied whistling ducks on a nest box in Central Florida

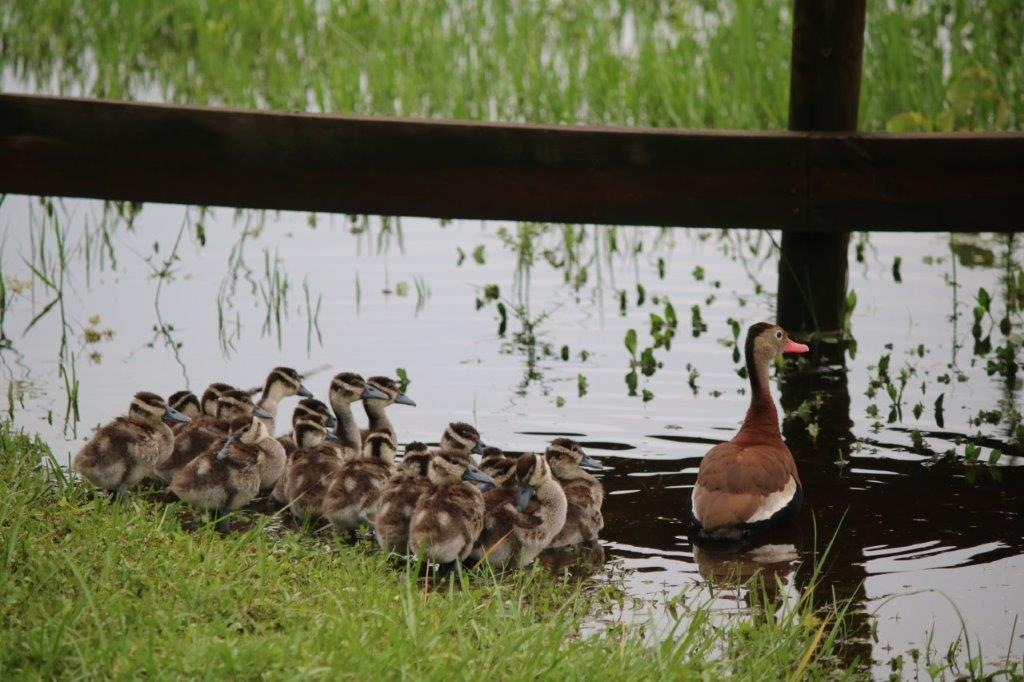
An adult Black-bellied Whistling Duck and sixteen ducklings in Parrish, Florida

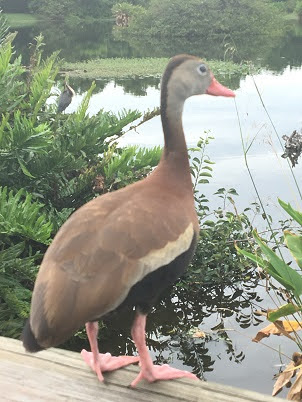
Adult at a nature preserve in Boynton Beach, Florida

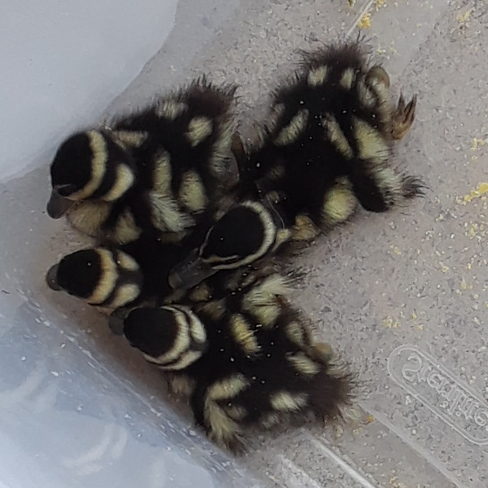
Black-bellied whistling ducklings in South Texas

== Sources ==
- Bencke, Glayson Ariel (2007): Avifauna atual do Rio Grande do Sul, Brasil: aspectos biogeográficos e distribucionais ["The Recent avifauna of Rio Grande do Sul: Biogeographical and distributional aspects"]. Talk held on 2007-JUN-22 at Quaternário do RS: integrando conhecimento, Canoas, Rio Grande do Sul, Brazil. PDF abstract
- Madge, Steve; Burn, Hilary (1987). Wildfowl: an identification guide to the ducks, geese and swans of the world. London: Christopher Helm. ISBN 0-7470-2201-1.
