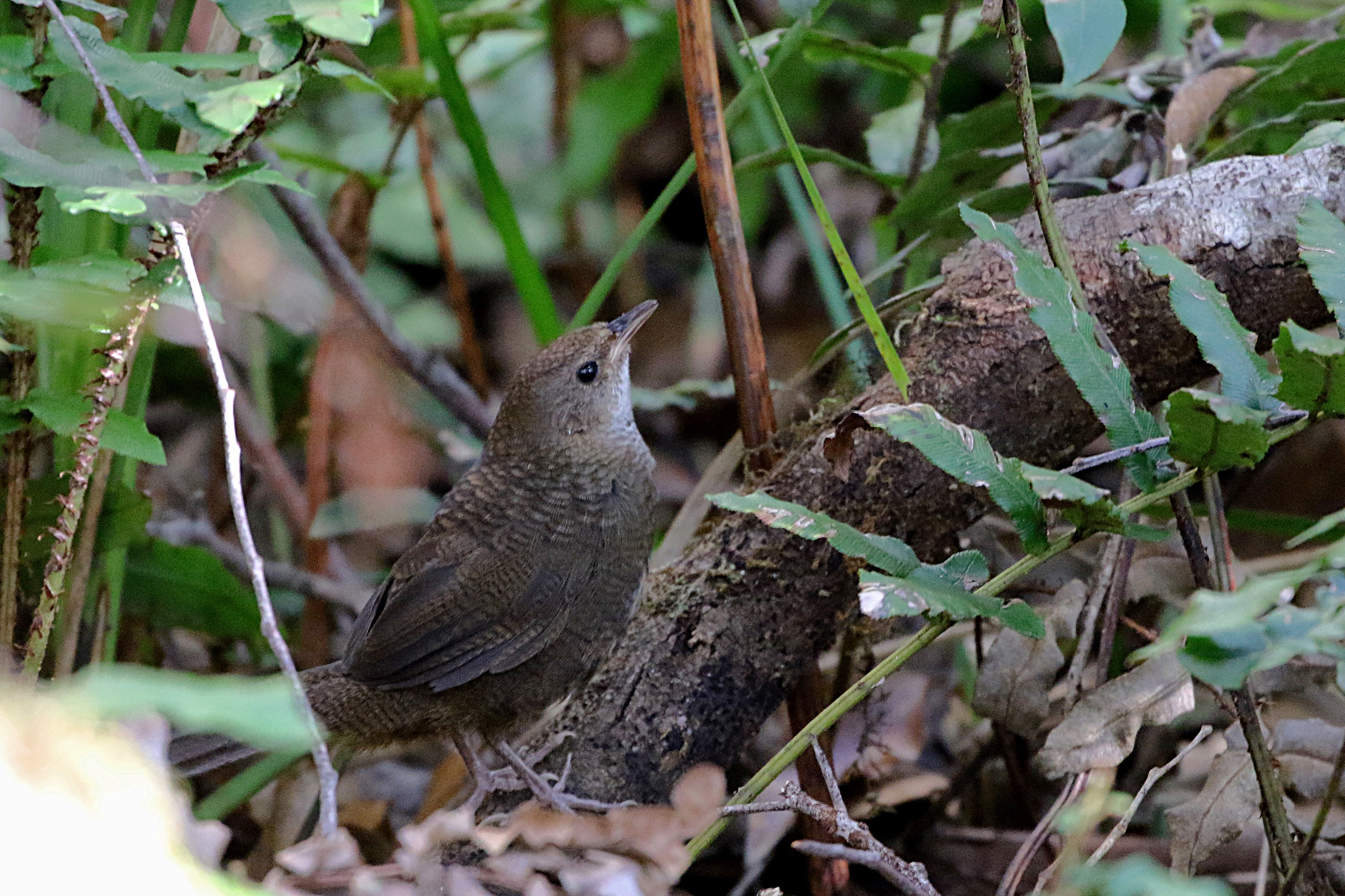

Conservation status
- Endangered (IUCN 3.1)

Scientific classification
- Kingdom: Animalia
- Phylum: Chordata
- Class: Aves
- Order: Passeriformes
- Family: Atrichornithidae
- Genus: Atrichornis
- Species: A. rufescens

Binomial name
- Atrichornis rufescens (Ramsay, 1866)
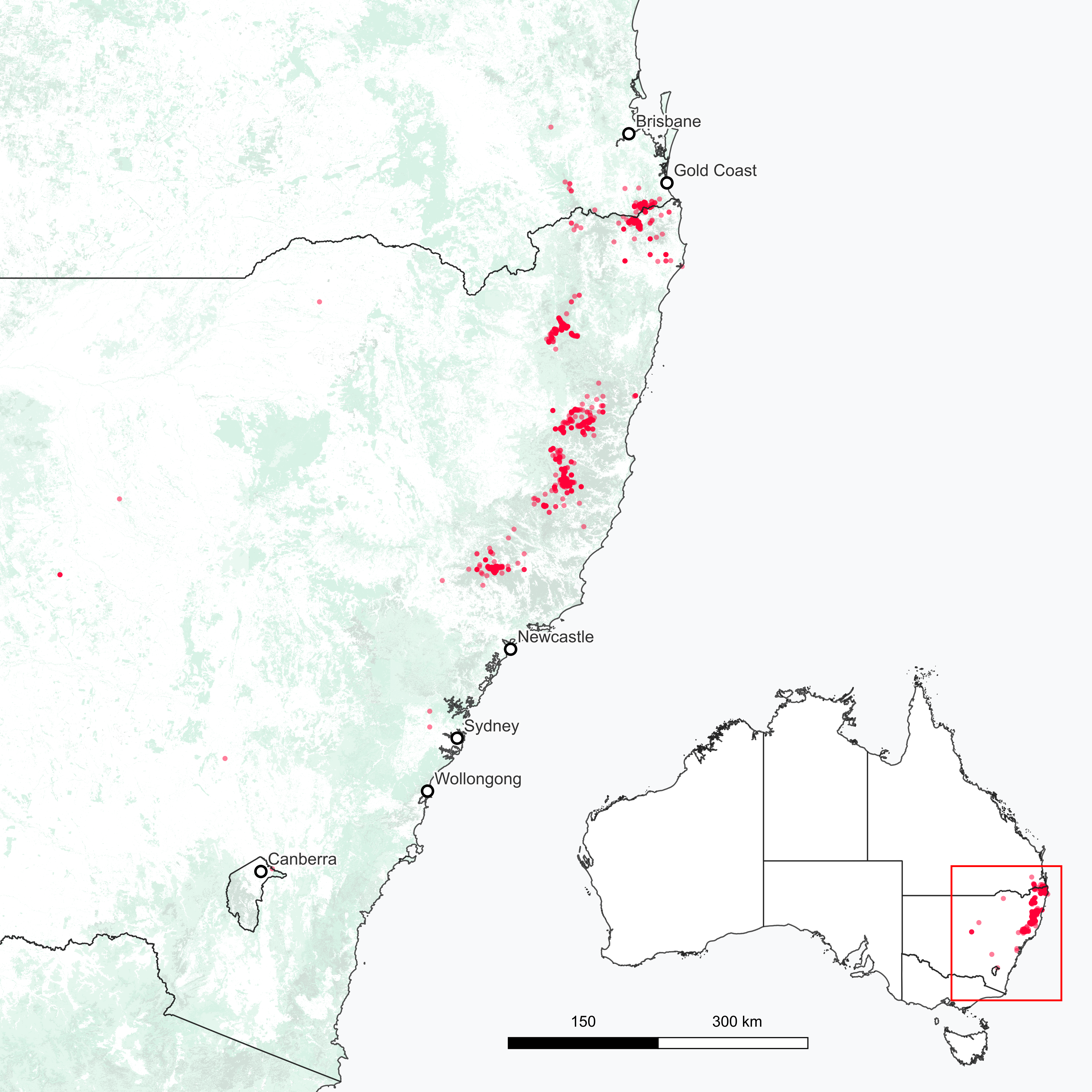
- Species distribution

Synonyms
- Atrichia rufescens Ramsay

= Rufous scrubbird =

Species of bird

The rufous scrubbird (Atrichornis rufescens) is a species of bird in the family Atrichornithidae. It is endemic to eastern Australia.

== Taxonomy ==
One of two species of Atrichornis, known as scrubbirds, the only extant populations of the Atrichornithidae family; the noisy scrubbird Atrichornis clamosus is restricted to a small population in western Australia.

Two subspecies are recognized: the nominate Atrichornis rufescens rufescens, and A. rufescens ferrieri.

The description of a new species by Edward Pierson Ramsay, Atrichia rufescens, was published in 1867 in the Proceedings of the Zoological Society of London (1866). Ramsay purchased two male specimens from T. MacGillivray and compared them with a previously described species from the southwest of Australia. The collector J. F. Wilcox shot these specimens in dense vegetation along the edge of Bowling Creek, near the Richmond River in New South Wales, noting the great difficulty in obtaining them. The epithet rufescens was proposed for the rufous tint of the plumage that distinguished it from the western scrubbird, named by John Gould as Atrichia clamosa.

== Description ==
Both sexes are brown with a rufous breast and a lightly barred back. The male has a long white streak on both sides on his neck and noticeable white edging on his throat. The female has a lighter breast and lacks the white edging. They are known for loud vocalisations and at times can produce extensive repertoire of mimicry.

== Distribution and habitat ==
The species occurs only in isolated locations in north-eastern New South Wales and south-eastern Queensland. It requires dense ground cover and deep leaf-litter in rainforest and wet eucalypt forest, at elevations above 600 m, where it forages on snails and insects on the ground.

== Conservation ==
By the mid-20th century, it was almost extinct. A subsequent recovery to Near Threatened status in 2004 was followed by successive uplisting to Vulnerable and Endangered status in 2008 and 2012 respectively, in consideration of the fragmented status and small size of remaining habitats. Total population size was estimated at a low of ~2,500 pairs in the 1980s, but is estimated at 1,850 – 2,960 mature individuals as of 2022.

Most of the early decline is believed to have been driven by the clearance of the species' lowland habitats, and logging practices are implicated in current declines, together with natural aging (and consequent disappearance of understorey) of remaining eucalypt stands.

Fires in late 2019 burnt 37% of all 1x1 km squares from which birds have been recorded since 1990, mostly in the Main and Gibraltar Ranges with the largest subpopulations on the Lamington Plateau and Border Ranges largely unaffected (G Ehmke unpublished).

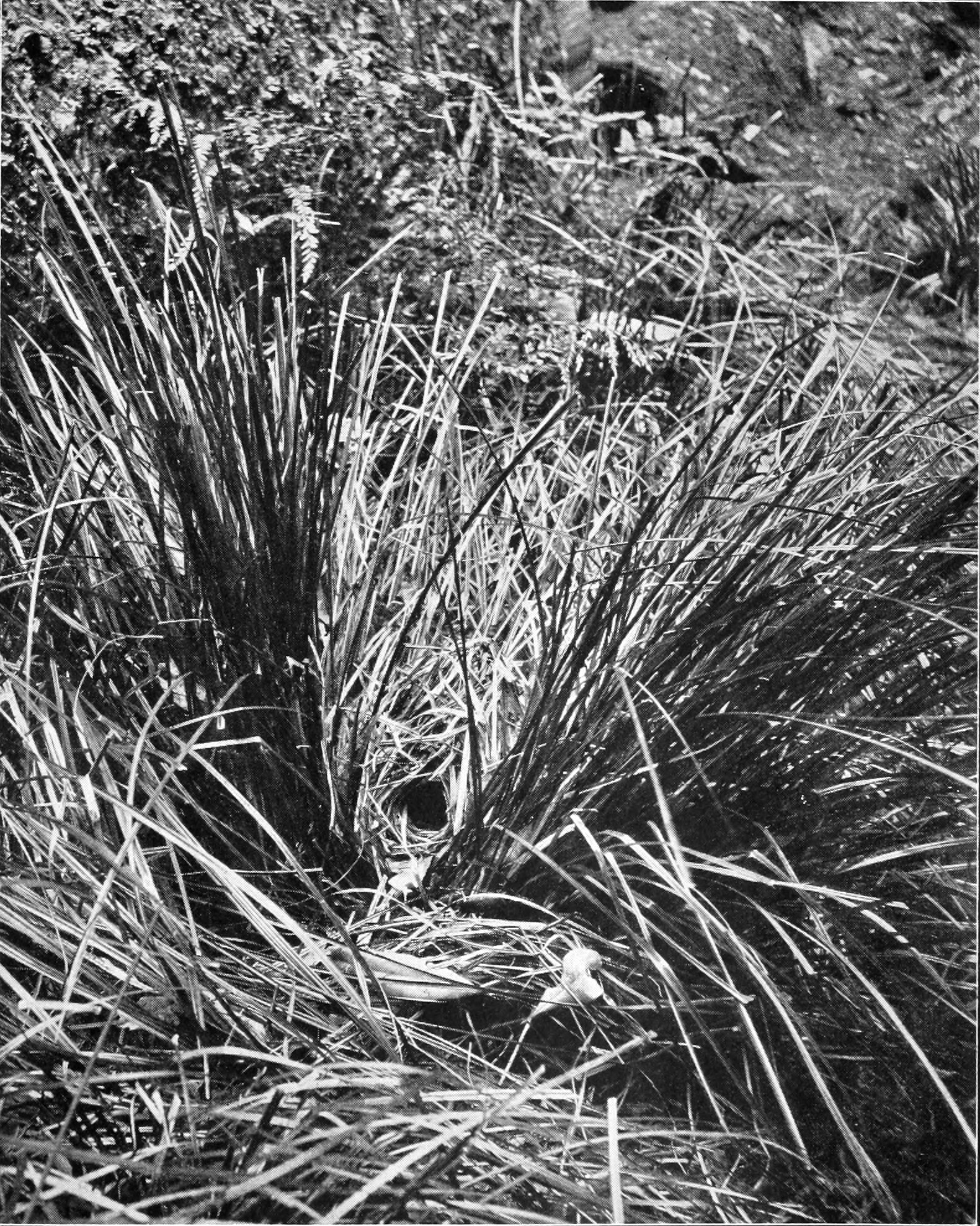
Nest photographed by S. W. Jackson, 1910
