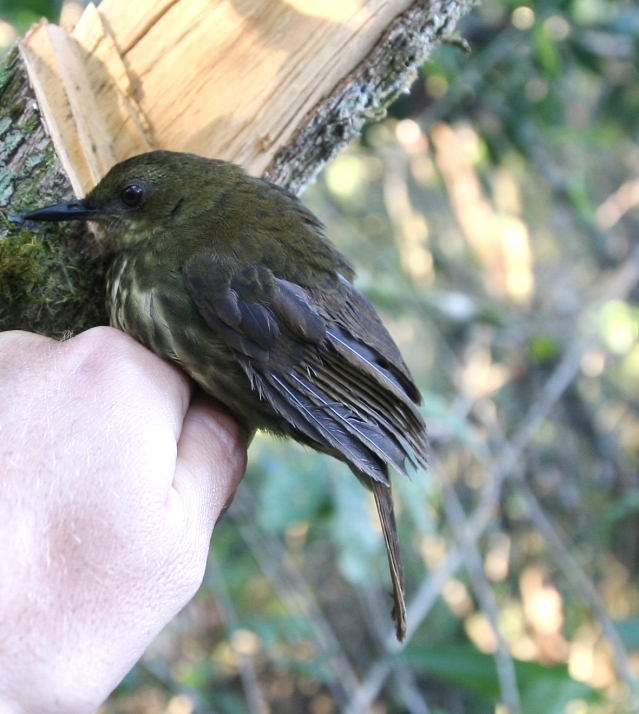
- Dapple-throat (Arcanator orostruthus)

Scientific classification
- Kingdom: Animalia
- Phylum: Chordata
- Class: Aves
- Order: Passeriformes
- Parvorder: Passerida
- Family: Modulatricidae; Fjeldsa et al., 2015

Synonyms
- Arcanatoridae

= Modulatricidae =

Family of birds

Modulatricidae is a small family of passerine birds which are restricted to Africa. The family is made up of three species in three separate genera, Modulatrix, Arcanator and Kakamega, of brown thrush-like birds. These species have been taxonomic enigmas in the past, having been placed in a number of families including the Old World flycatchers (Muscicapidae), thrushes (Turdidae), and the Old World babblers (Timaliidae sensu lato). They are now known to form a clade sister either to the sugarbirds or to the majority of Passeroidea.

The Modulatricidae have a disjunct distribution in Africa, living in the dense undergrowth of montane forests, principally in East Africa but with a population of the grey-chested babbler in Cameroon and Nigeria. They are poorly studied little is known about their ecology and behaviour. They live on or near the forest floor, and feed on insects and berries, with insects sought by either probing leaf litter or tossing it aside. Two species, the spot-throat and grey-chested babbler, have been observed following swarms of driver ants.

== Species ==
=== Species ===
Genus Modulatrix – Ripley, 1952 – one species
Common name	Scientific name and subspecies	Range	Size and ecology	IUCN status and estimated population
Spot-throat	Modulatrix stictigula (Reichenow, 1906)	Eastern Arc forests of eastern Africa	Size: Habitat: Diet:	LC

Genus Arcanator – Irwin & Clancey, 1986 – one species
Common name	Scientific name and subspecies	Range	Size and ecology	IUCN status and estimated population
Dapple-throat or dappled mountain robin or dappled mountain greenbul	Arcanator orostruthus (Vincent, 1933)	Disjunct distribution, occurring in several mountain ranges, including the Usambara and Udzungwa Mountains in Tanzania and the Njesi Highlands and Mount Mabu in northern Mozambique	Size: Habitat: Dense, wet mountain forest habitat. It can be found in the leaf litter near streams. Diet: Insects	NT

Genus Kakamega – Mann, Burton, PJK & Lennerstedt, 1978 – one species
Common name	Scientific name and subspecies	Range	Size and ecology	IUCN status and estimated population
Grey-chested babbler	Kakamega poliothorax (Reichenow, 1900)	Cameroon line, western Kenya and the Albertine rift montane forests	Size: Habitat: Subtropical or tropical moist montane forests. Diet:	LC
