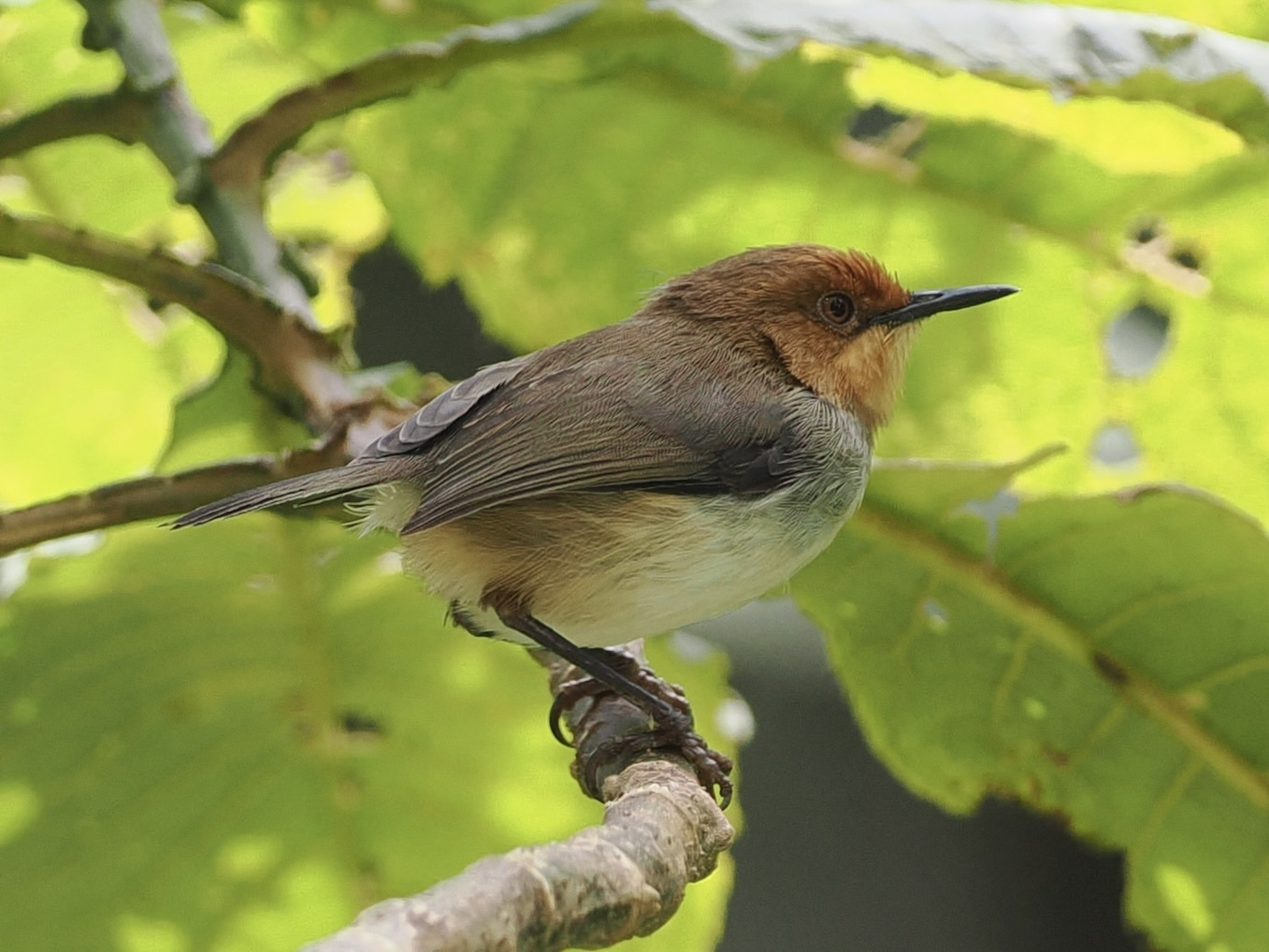

Conservation status
- Least Concern (IUCN 3.1)

Scientific classification
- Kingdom: Animalia
- Phylum: Chordata
- Class: Aves
- Order: Passeriformes
- Family: Cisticolidae
- Genus: Artisornis
- Species: A. metopias

Binomial name
- Artisornis metopias (Reichenow, 1907)

Synonyms
- Prinia metopias (protonym); Orthotomus metopias

Audio
- Call

= Red-capped forest warbler =

Species of bird

The red-capped forest warbler (Artisornis metopias), also known as the African tailorbird, is a songbird of the family Cisticolidae, formerly part of the "Old World warbler" assemblage. It is found in Mozambique and Tanzania. Its natural habitat is subtropical or tropical moist montane forests from 1600 to 2500 m.

== Taxonomy ==
The red-capped forest warbler was formally described in 1907 by the German ornithologist Anton Reichenow from a specimen collected in the Usambara Mountains of Tanzania. Reichenow coined the binomial name Prinia metopias. The specific epithet is from the Ancient Greek metōpias meaning "having a high forehead". This warbler is now placed with the long-billed forest warbler in the genus Artisornis that was introduced in 1928 by the American ornithologist Herbert Friedmann.

Two subspecies are recognised:

- Artisornis metopias metopias (Reichenow, 1907) – northeast Tanzania to northwest Mozambique
- Artisornis metopias altus (Friedmann, 1927) – Uluguru Mountains (east Tanzania)

== Description ==
The red-capped forest warbler is olive-brown above with a whitish color from the center of the throat to the vent, and with flanks that are washed grey. The crown is a rich chestnut brown, as well as the ear-coverts and the sides of the neck. Immature individuals have a pale yellow wash on their undersides. The average adult is 10 cm long and has a mass of approximately 8.4 g.
