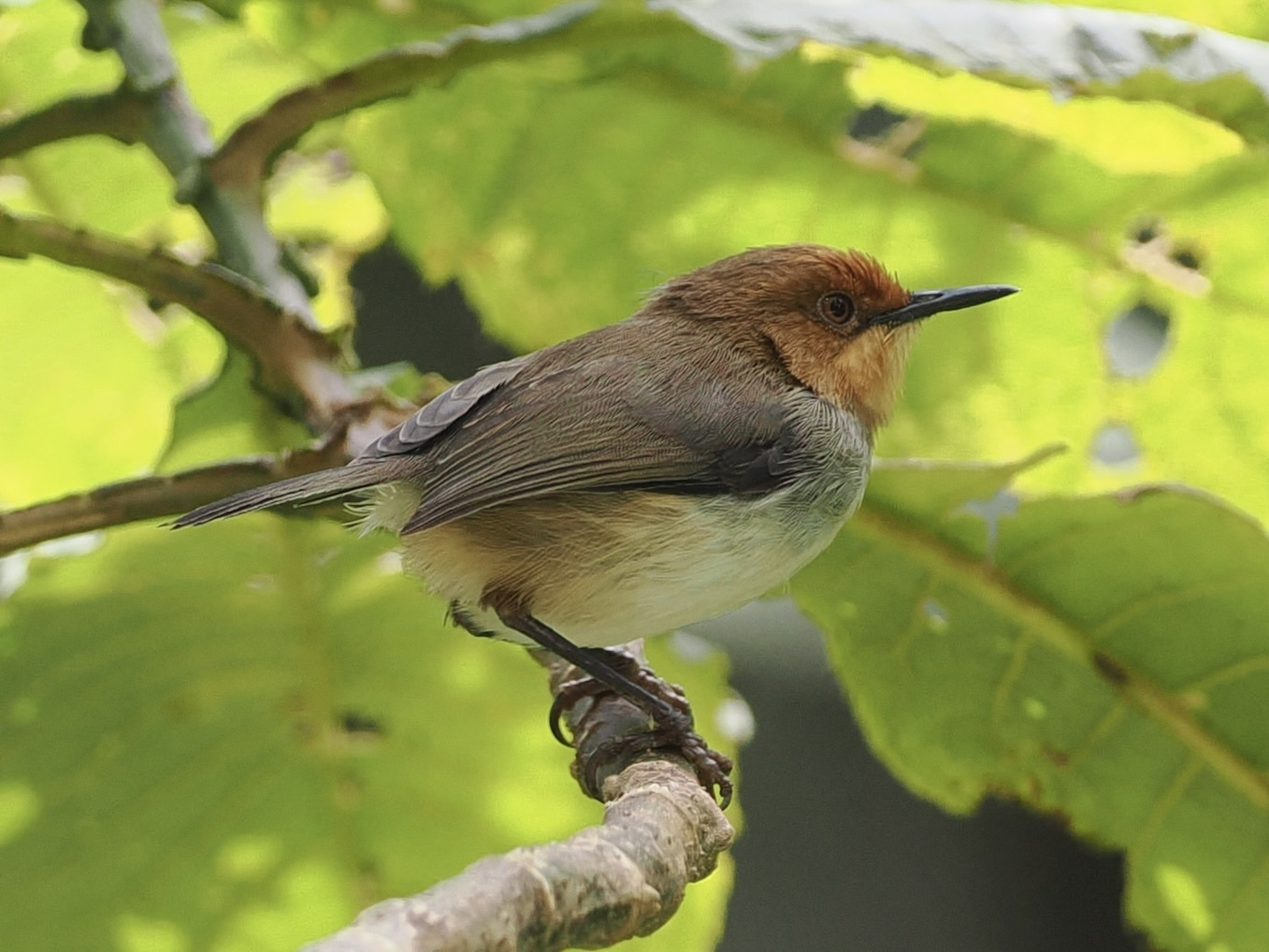
- A. metopias
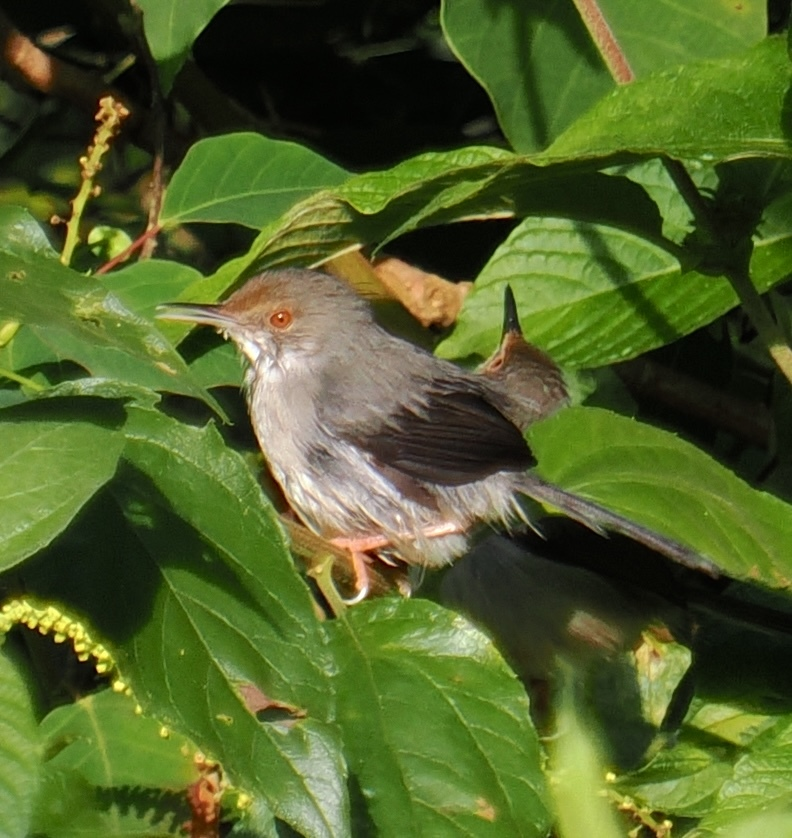
- A. moreaui

Scientific classification
- Kingdom: Animalia
- Phylum: Chordata
- Class: Aves
- Order: Passeriformes
- Family: Cisticolidae
- Genus: Artisornis; Friedmann, 1928

Type species
- Opifex altus (red-capped forest warbler) Friedmann, 1927

Species
- See text

= Artisornis =

Genus of birds

Artisornis is a genus of birds in the family Cisticolidae. It contains the following species:

- Red-capped forest warbler, Artisornis metopias
- Long-billed forest warbler, Artisornis moreaui

== Taxonomy ==
The genus Artisornis was introduced in 1928 by the American ornithologist Herbert Friedmann to accommodate the red-capped forest warbler. The name combines the Ancient Greek artēsō meaning "to fasten" with ornis meaning "bird". The Handbook of the Birds of the World/BirdLife International taxonomy splits an additional species, the Mozambique forest-warbler (Artisornis sousae), from A. moreaui. IOC taxonomy maintains it as a subspecies (A. moreaui sousae).
