= Kakameganula =

Scientific classification
- Kingdom: Animalia
- Phylum: Arthropoda
- Subphylum: Chelicerata
- Class: Arachnida
- Order: Araneae
- Infraorder: Araneomorphae
- Family: Salticidae
- Genus: Kakameganula; Wesołowska, 2020
- Species: K. holmi

Binomial name
- Kakameganula holmi (Dawidowicz & Wesołowska, 2016)

Synonyms
- Kakamega holmi Dawidowicz & Wesołowska, 2016, invalid; genus name preoccupied by Kakamega de Mann, Burton & Lennerstedt, 1978

Genus of jumping spiders

Kakameganula is a monotypic genus of east African jumping spiders containing the single species, Kakameganula holmi. The genus was first described by Angelika Dawidowicz & Wanda Wesołowska in 2016 under the name Kakamega, and was placed in subtribe Thiratoscirtina within the tribe Aelurillini of the Salticoida clade of Salticinae.

In 2020, it was discovered that the name was already in use for the bird genus Kakamega de Mann, Burton & Lennerstedt, 1978, and Kakameganula was published as a replacement name.

== See also ==
- List of Salticidae genera
