= Michael Patrick Stuart Irwin =

- Born: 1 July 1925; Donaghadee, County Down, Northern Ireland
- Died: 13 September 2017 (aged 92); Litcham, Norfolk
- Citizenship: British, Rhodesian
- Known for: The Birds of Zimbabwe
- Scientific career
- Fields: Ornithology
- Institutions: Natural History Museum of Zimbabwe
- Author abbrev. (zoology): Irwin

Michael Patrick Stuart Irwin (1925 – 13 September 2017) was a British-Rhodesian ornithologist.

== Biography ==
Irwin was born in Northern Ireland and moved to Southern Rhodesia (now Zimbabwe) in 1949 where he met Reay Smithers, then director of the National Museum of Southern Rhodesia in Bulawayo, and soon became collector with the museum. In 1959 he was assistant curator of vertebrates, subsequently curator of ornithology, in 1975 regional director in Bulawayo, and finally associate ornithologist, and as of 2012 a natural history librarian in Norfolk.

Irwin worked closely with Constantine Walter Benson, an authority on central African birds. Together, they expanded the bird collection of the Natural History Museum of Zimbabwe until it became the largest both in Africa and in the southern hemisphere. It currently houses over 90,000 specimens from Zimbabwe and neighbouring countries and is one of the museum's greatest resources.

In 1981, Irwin published his best known work The Birds of Zimbabwe, but he had previously published the Bibliography of the Birds of Rhodesia in 1978, and co-authored A Checklist of Birds of Southern Rhodesia (with Reay Smithers) in 1957 and The Birds of Zambia (with Constantine Walter Benson) in 1971. He contributed also to The Birds of Africa series (with Emil K. Urban, Stuart Keith and C. Hilary Fry) and has published more than 300 scientific papers, many of them in the museum's journal Arnoldia.

Irwin described the subspecies Spizocorys conirostris crypta of the pink-billed lark in 1957, the subspecies Eremopterix verticalis khama of the grey-backed sparrow-lark in 1957, the subspecies Calamonastes stierlingi pinto of the Stierling's wren-warbler in 1960, and together with Benson the subspecies Eremopterix verticalis harti in 1965 and the subspecies Mirafra fasciolata reynoldsi of the eastern clapper lark in 1965. In collaboration with Phillip Clancey he described the monotypic genus Arcanator for the dapple-throat in 1986.

Irwin was editor of Honeyguide, an ornithological journal of Bird Life Zimbabwe, for 24 years.

In May 2017, he had a severe fall and in September 2017 he died from the consequences of a hip fracture.
