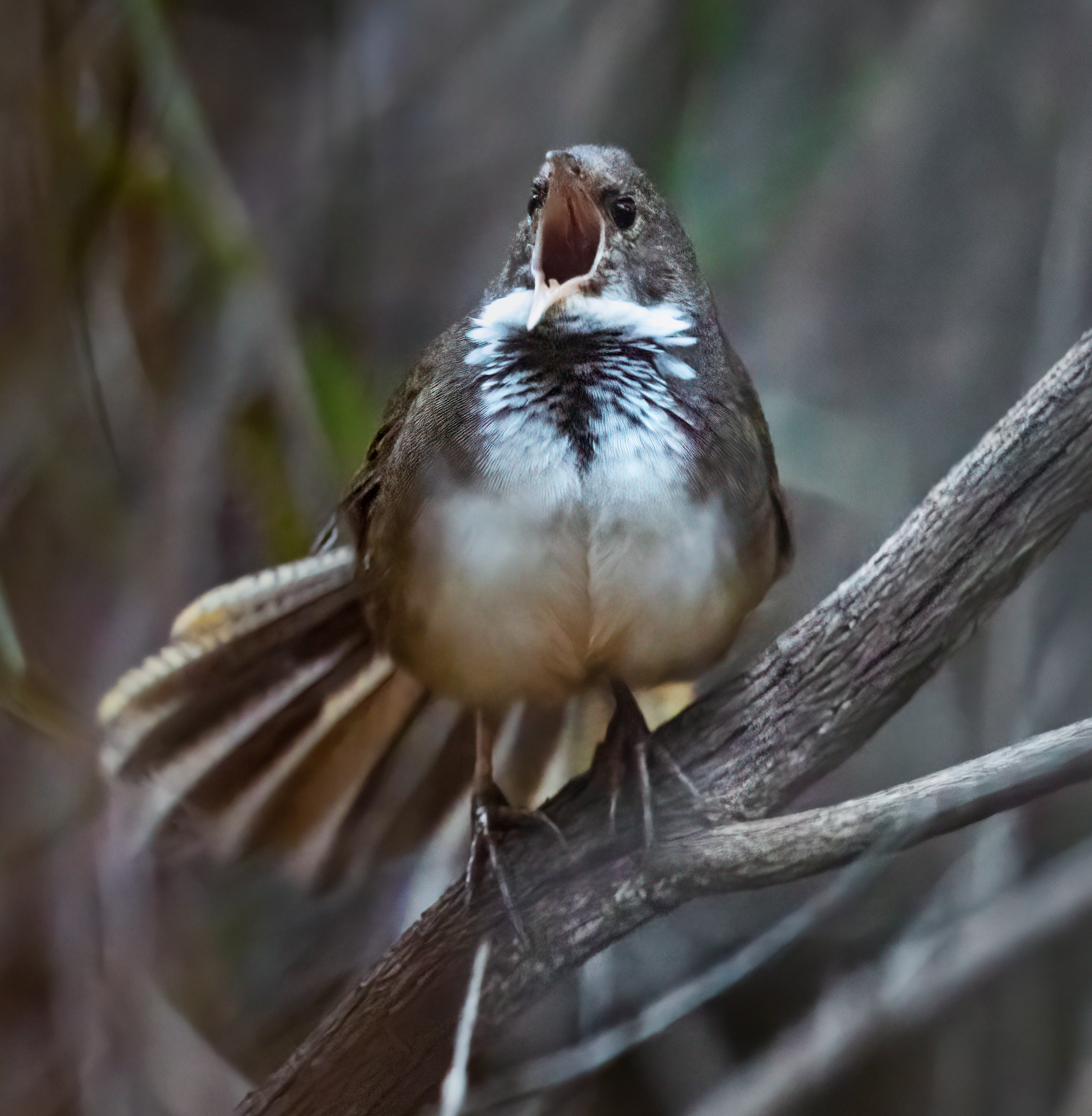
- Noisy scrubbird (Atrichornis clamosus) calling

Scientific classification
- Kingdom: Animalia
- Phylum: Chordata
- Class: Aves
- Order: Passeriformes
- Suborder: Passeri
- Infraorder: Menurides

Families
- Atrichornithidae (scrubbirds); Menuridae (lyrebirds)

= Menurides =

Infraorder of birds

Menurides is an infraorder of songbirds. It contains the scrubbirds and lyrebirds.
