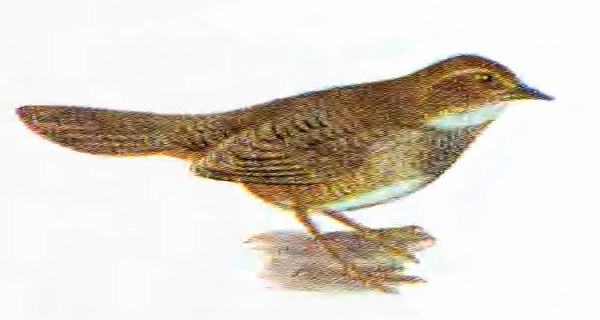
- Noisy scrubbird (Atrichornis clamosus)

Scientific classification
- Kingdom: Animalia
- Phylum: Chordata
- Class: Aves
- Order: Passeriformes
- Clade: Eupasseres
- Suborder: Passeri
- Infraorder: Menurides
- Family: Atrichornithidae; Stejneger, 1885
- Genus: Atrichornis; Stejneger, 1885

Type species
- Atrichia clamosa Gould, 1844

Species
- Atrichornis rufescens; Atrichornis clamosus

= Scrubbird =

Genus of birds

Scrubbirds are shy, secretive, ground-dwelling birds of the family Atrichornithidae. There are just two species. The rufous scrubbird is rare and very restricted in its range, and the noisy scrubbird is so rare that until 1961 it was thought to be extinct. Both are native to Australia.

The scrubbird family is ancient and is understood to be most closely related to the lyrebirds, and probably also the bowerbirds and treecreepers. All four families originated with the great corvid radiation of the Australia-New Guinea region.

The population of the noisy scrubbird was estimated at 40 to 45 birds in 1962. Conservation efforts succeeded in increasing the population to around 400 birds by the mid-1980s, and they have subsequently been reintroduced to several sites, but remain endangered. As of 2002, the population had recovered to around 1,200 birds.

== Description ==
Birds of both species are about the same size as a common starling (roughly 20 cm long) and cryptically coloured in drab browns and blacks. They occupy dense undergrowth—the rufous scrubbird in temperate rain forests near the Queensland-New South Wales border, the noisy scrubbird in heaths and scrubby gullies in coastal Western Australia—and are adept at scuttling mouse-like under cover to avoid notice. They run fast, but their flight is feeble.

The males' calls, however, are powerful: ringing and metallic, with a ventriloquial quality, so loud as to be heard from a long distance in heavy scrub and almost painful at close range. Females build a domed nest close to the ground and take sole responsibility for raising the young.

== Species of Atrichornithidae ==
Image	Scientific name	Common name	Distribution
	Atrichornis rufescens	Rufous scrubbird	north-eastern New South Wales and south-eastern Queensland
	Atrichornis clamosus	Noisy scrubbird	east of Albany in Western Australia
