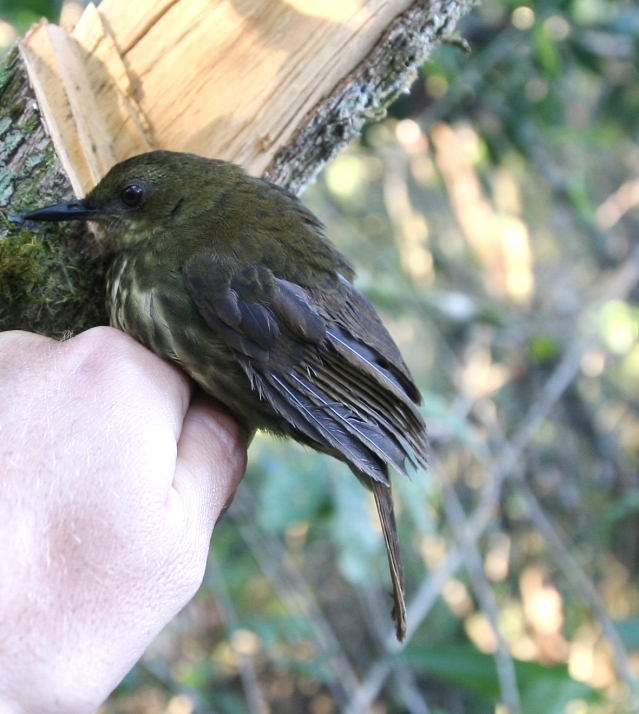

Conservation status
- Near Threatened (IUCN 3.1)

Scientific classification
- Kingdom: Animalia
- Phylum: Chordata
- Class: Aves
- Order: Passeriformes
- Family: Modulatricidae
- Genus: Arcanator; Irwin & Clancey, 1986
- Species: A. orostruthus

Binomial name
- Arcanator orostruthus (Vincent, 1933)

Synonyms
- Phyllastrephus orostruthus Vincent, 1933; Modulatrix orostruthus Ripley, 1964

= Dapple-throat =

Species of bird

The dapple-throat (Arcanator orostruthus) is a species of bird in the small African family Modulatricidae. Other common names include dappled mountain robin and dappled mountain greenbul. It is native to Mozambique and Tanzania. This is the only species in the monotypic genus Arcanator.

This species has a disjunct distribution, occurring in a few mountain ranges, including the Usambara and Udzungwa Mountains in Tanzania and the Njesi Highlands and Mount Mabu in northern Mozambique. It lives in dense, wet mountain forest habitat. It can be found in the leaf litter near streams, where it seeks insects.

Most all of the native habitat is degraded or otherwise influenced by human activity. Much of the forest has been cleared for agricultural purposes. Logging also occurs, especially to obtain timber from the forest tree Faurea wentzeliana; this reduces the density of the forest, reducing habitat quality for the bird. Some populations are in protected areas, but the species is thought to be in general decline.
