= Jack Vincent =

English ornithologist

Jack Vincent MBE (6 March 1904 – 3 July 1999) was an English ornithologist.

== Biography ==
Vincent was born in London. At age 21 he moved to South Africa where he worked on two farms in the Richmond district of the Natal Province. In the 1920s he went back to England where he became a bird collector for the British Museum in London. From the late 1920s to the early 1930s he accompanied Admiral Hubert Lynes on several ornithological expeditions to East Africa, Central Africa and Southern Africa. Most memorable was his travel to the Mount Namuli massif in Mozambique in 1932 where he discovered some bird taxa new to science including the Namuli apalis (Apalis lynesi) and the dapple-throat (Arcanator orostruthus). In 1934 he married the Scottish girl Mary Russell in Cape Town. In 1937 Vincent bought a farm in the Mooi River district of Natal.

During World War II he served as colonel with the Natal Carbineers in East and Northern Africa. Afterwards he was awarded Member of the Order of the British Empire for his services. In 1942 he moved to a post at the British Army in Haifa, British Mandate of Palestine.

In 1949 Jack Vincent became corresponding member of the American Ornithologists' Union and the first director of the Natal Parks, Game and Fish Preservation Board (in short: Natal Parks Board), a body which played an important role in the conservation of the white rhinoceros in KwaZulu-Natal in the 1950s. From the late 1940s to the early 1950s he was editor of Ostrich: Journal of African Ornithology the journal of the South African Ornithological Society.

From 1963 to 1967 he took part on conservation projects of the International Council for Bird Preservation (now: BirdLife International). For this work he received the gold medal of the World Wildlife Fund. In 1967 he rejoined the Natal Parks Board before he retired in 1974. After the death of his wife Mary in 1989 Jack Vincent moved to Pietermaritzburg. In 1993 he got the honorary doctorate degree of the University of KwaZulu-Natal. In 1999 he died at age 95 in Pietermaritzburg.

In 1950, the endangered Vincent's bush squirrel (Paraxerus vincenti) endemic to Mount Namuli was named in honour of Jack Vincent.

== Selected works ==
- Check List of the Birds of South Africa, 1952
- The Red Book: Wildlife in Danger, with James Fisher, Noel Simon, 1969
- Web of Experience: An Autobiography, 1989
