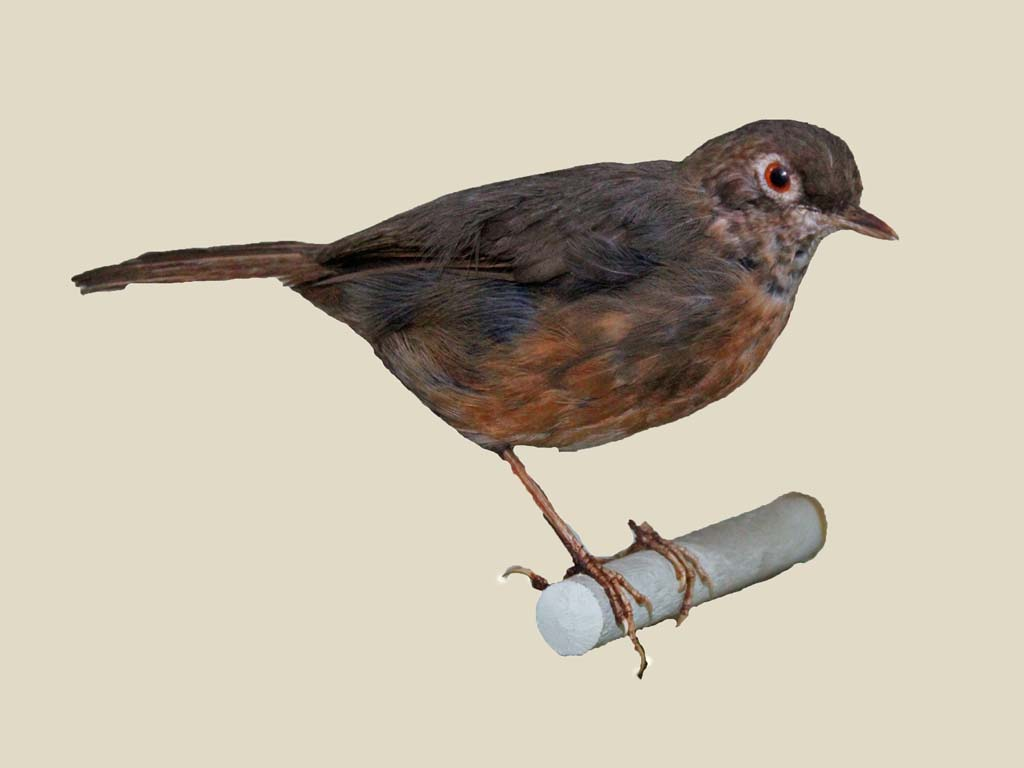
- Specimen at Nairobi National Museum
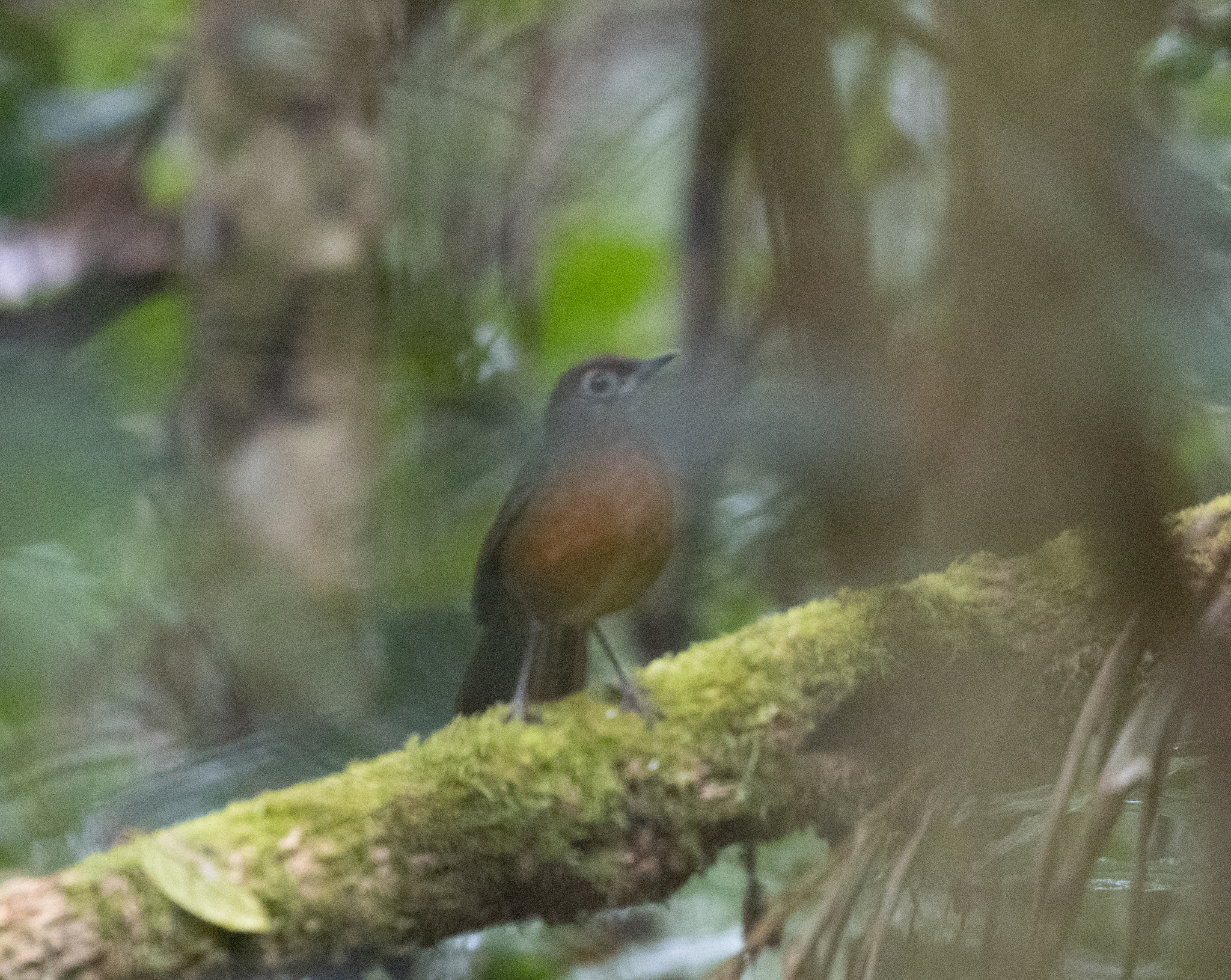

Conservation status
- Least Concern (IUCN 3.1)

Scientific classification
- Kingdom: Animalia
- Phylum: Chordata
- Class: Aves
- Order: Passeriformes
- Family: Modulatricidae
- Genus: Modulatrix; Ripley, 1952
- Species: M. stictigula

Binomial name
- Modulatrix stictigula (Reichenow, 1906)

Synonyms
- Turdinus stictigula Reichenow, 1906

= Spot-throat =

Species of bird

The spot-throat (Modulatrix stictigula) is a species of bird in the family Modulatricidae. It is the only member of the genus Modulatrix. It is native to the Eastern Arc forests.

This species is monotypic, although it was previously thought to have two subspecies.
