= Constantine Walter Benson =

British ornithologist (1909–1982)

- Born: 2 February 1909; Trull (Somerset)
- Died: 21 September 1982 (aged 73); Cambridge, UK
- Scientific career
- Fields: Ornithology

Constantine Walter Benson OBE (2 February 1909 – 21 September 1982) was a British ornithologist and author of over 350 publications. He is considered the last of a line of British Colonial officials that made significant contributions to ornithology.

== Education and career ==
Constantine Walter Benson was born in 1909 near Taunton in Somerset, and educated at Eton and Magdalene College, Cambridge. He was to become head of the Cambridge Bird Club. He became an officer in the Colonial Service in 1932 and was posted to Nyasaland, modern Malawi, where he spent over 20 years as a District Commissioner. He was elected a member of the British Ornithologists' Union in 1932. On arrival in Malawi, he began the systematic study of Malawian birds, training and making use of his servant and collector Jali Makawa. He met his wife Florence Mary Lanham (Molly), while visiting the Transvaal Museum where she worked as a botanist and they co-authored several publications. It has been reported that Benson tasted every specimen he collected; he claimed that turacos tasted the best, while owls tasted the worst.

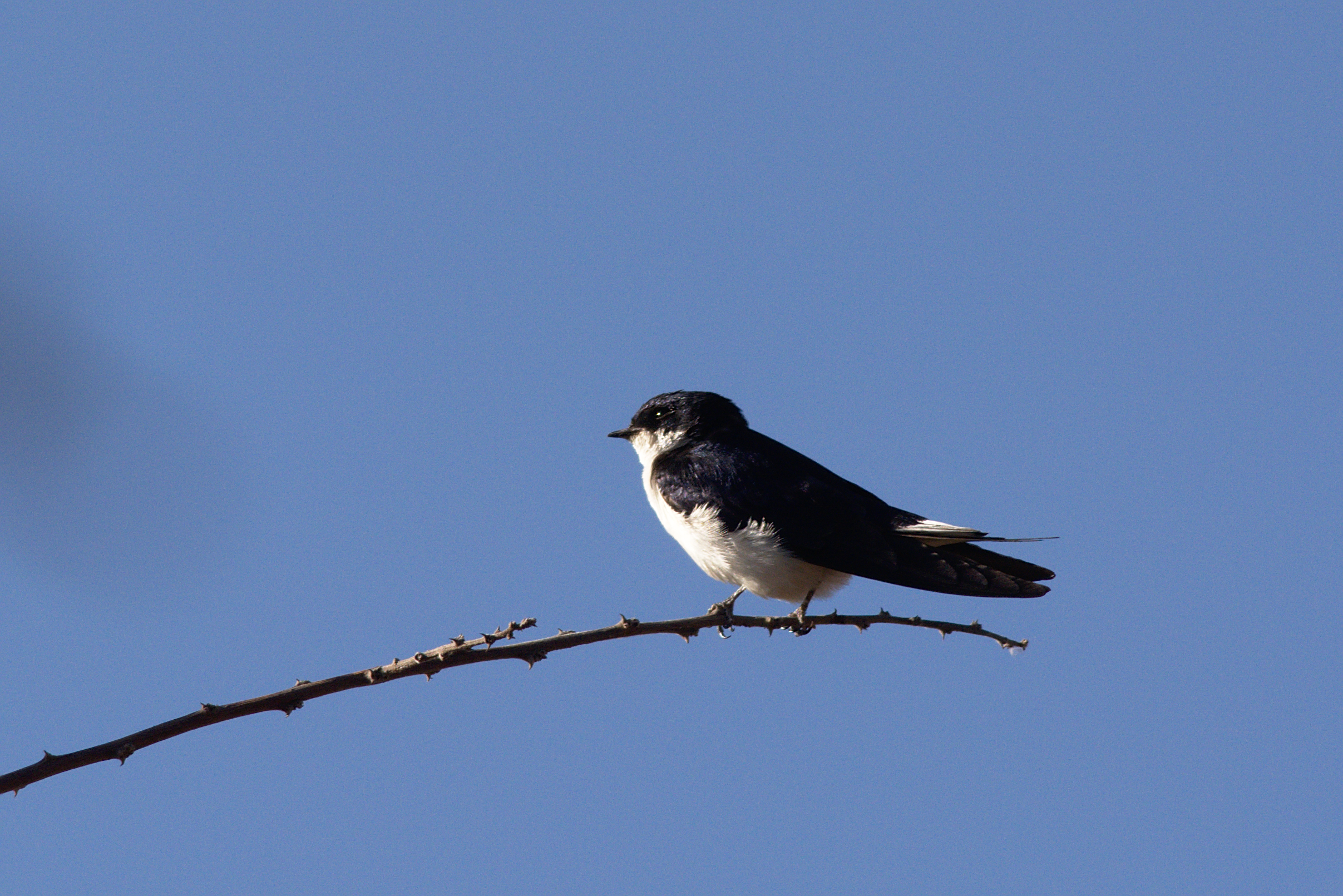
White-tailed swallow or Benson's swallow

He was a recognised expert on East African birds, and made a number of scientific discoveries including:

- Lufira masked weaver
- White-tailed swallow or Benson's swallow
- Roberts's warbler
- Aldabra brush warbler
- Karthala scops owl

In 1952 he was transferred from Nyasaland to the then Northern Rhodesia, (now Zambia) Game and Fisheries Department. There he remained until his retirement. In 1962 he was seconded to the Rhodes Livingstone Museum as assistant director. In 1958, whilst at the Game and Fisheries Department, he led the centenary expedition of the British Ornithological Union to the Comoro Islands.

== Work at the Cambridge University Museum of Zoology ==
After officially retiring in 1965, Benson continued to work on the collection of birds catalogue in the Cambridge University Museum of Zoology, which had been untouched since 1907 and the death of Alfred Newton, one of the founders of the British Ornithologists Union. At first this work was supported by a grant from the Leverhulme Trust and the University of Cambridge, but from 1972 he worked unpaid. The museum archives contain material from Benson's collection, field notebooks from Benson's expeditions in Africa, and correspondence about the classification of the museum bird collection. He was supported in his work by his botanist wife Florence Mary Benson, who co-authored some of his works.

== Publications ==
He wrote many books and articles during and after his time in the Colonial Service. His works include:

- "Birds of the Comoro Islands" (1960)
- "A Contribution to the Ornithology of Zambia" (1967)
- "Birds of Zambia" (1971)
- "The Birds of Malawi" (1977).

== Awards and honours ==
Benson was awarded the OBE in 1965 for his work in Africa, the Union Medal of the British Ornithological Union in 1960 and the Gill Memorial Medal of the Southern Africa Ornithological Society in 1980.
