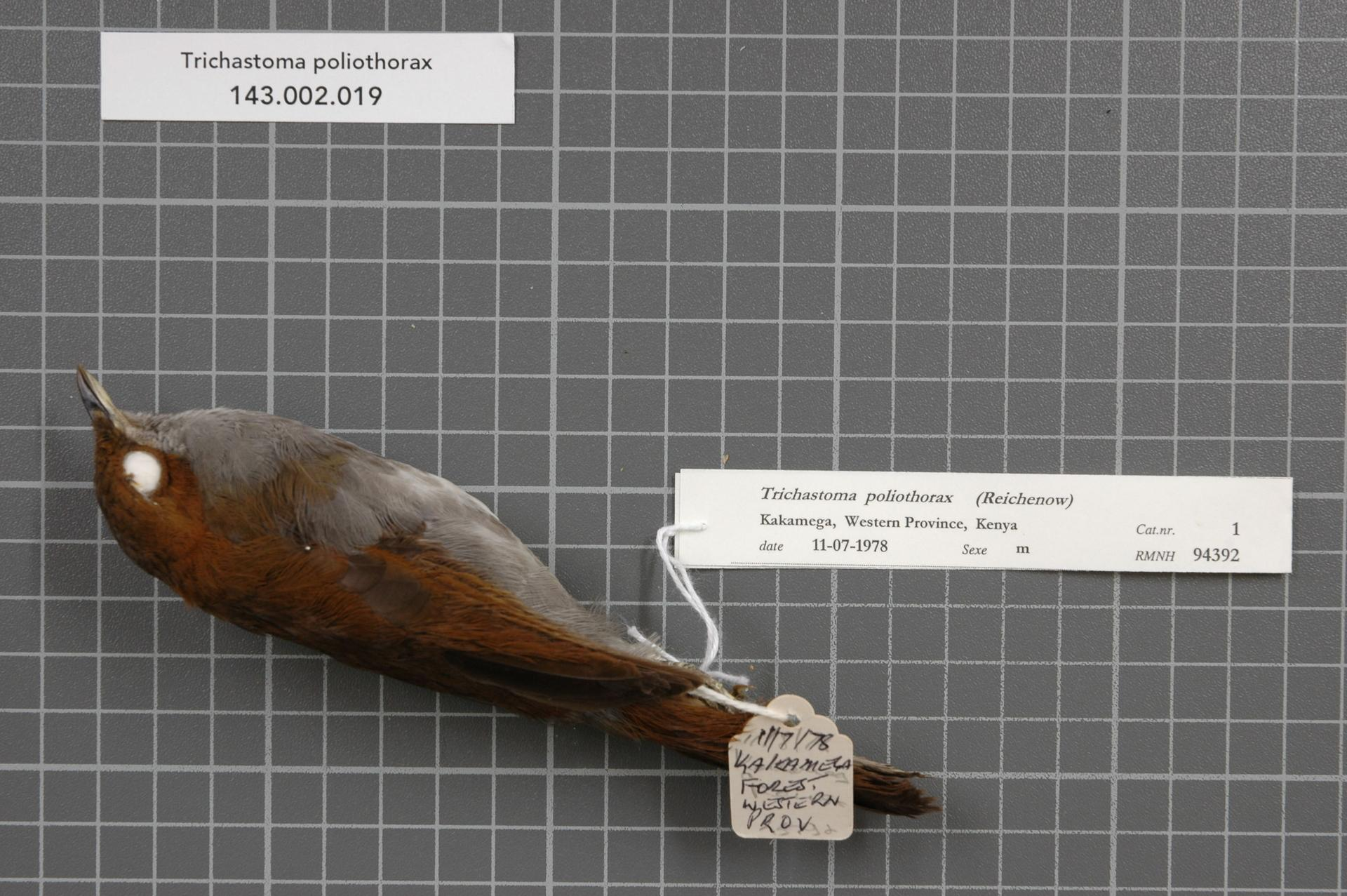

Conservation status
- Least Concern (IUCN 3.1)

Scientific classification
- Kingdom: Animalia
- Phylum: Chordata
- Class: Aves
- Order: Passeriformes
- Family: Modulatricidae
- Genus: Kakamega; Mann, Burton, PJK & Lennerstedt, 1978
- Species: K. poliothorax

Binomial name
- Kakamega poliothorax (Reichenow, 1900)

Synonyms
- Alethe poliothorax Reichenow, 1900

= Grey-chested babbler =

Species of bird

The grey-chested babbler (Kakamega poliothorax), also known as the grey-chested kakamega or grey-chested illadopsis, is a species of bird in the family Modulatricidae. It is the only species in its genus.

It is found in the Cameroon line, western Kenya and the Albertine rift montane forests. Its natural habitat is subtropical or tropical moist montane forests.
