= Njesi Highlands =

Mountain range in Mozambique

- Serra Jeci
- Location within Mozambique

Highest point
- Elevation: 1,843 m (6,047 ft)
- Coordinates: 12°35′58.34″S 35°15′32.1″E

Naming
- Language of name: Portuguese

Geography
- Country: Mozambique
- Province: Niassa

The Njesi Highlands (Portuguese: Serra Jeci) are a range of mountains in northern Mozambique.

== Geography ==
The highlands rise east of Lake Malawi in the western portion of Mozambique's Niassa Province. They are north of Lichinga, the provincial capital. The highest peaks are three inselbergs, the Njesi Plateau (1,843 m), Mount Chitagal (1,784 m), and Mount Sanga (1,782 m). The three peaks form part of a ridgeline that runs southwest to northeast. The Njesi Plateau is the southernmost peak, 30km from Mount Chitagal, and Mount Sanga is 25 km north of Mount Chitagal. Lake Malawi known in Mozambique as Lake Niassa, lies in the East African Rift, and the ridge and the highlands form part of the rift valley's eastern wall.

The western slope of the highlands is drained by the Messinge River, and the Luchulingo River drains the eastern slope. Both rivers are northward-flowing tributaries of the Rovuma River. The Messinge River valley separates the Njesi Plateau from Serra Macuta, a similar plateau lying to the west.

== Flora ==
The highlands are mostly covered in miombo woodland, and are in the eastern Miombo woodlands ecoregion. The three peaks include patches of Afromontane forest, higher-elevation evergreen forests which are home to species distinct from those of the surrounding lowlands. Other higher-elevation plant communities include Afromontane grassland and protea shrubland.

== Fauna ==
In the 20th century the mountains had been little surveyed by biologists, due in part to the long Mozambican Civil War from the mid-1970s to the 1990s.

Large mammals include the African buffalo (Syncerus caffer), klipspringer (Oreotragus oreotragus), sable antelope (Hippotragus niger), bushpig (Potamochoerus larvatus), leopard (Panthera pardus), side-striped jackal (Canis adustus), spotted hyena (Crocuta crocuta), and yellow baboon (Papio cynocephalus).

21st-century biological surveys of the mountain have documented some limited-range and endangered animals living in the highlands. These include the Mozambique forest warbler (Artisornis sousae) which is endemic to the highlands and lives in the Afromontane and riparian forests. It was identified as a separate species in 2016, and had previously been classed as a subspecies of the long-billed tailorbird (Artisornis moreaui), which is found over 900 km north in the Usambara Mountains of Tanzania. Other bird species found in the highlands include the montane nightjar (Caprimulgus poliocephalus), eastern green tinkerbird (Pogoniulus simplex), dark batis (Batis crypta), yellow-streaked greenbul (Phyllastrephus flavostriatus), Eurasian blackcap (Sylvia atricapilla), dapple-throat (Arcanator orostruthus), green twinspot (Mandingoa nitidula), Southern citril (Crithagra hyposticta), and Vincent's bunting (Emberiza vincenti).
