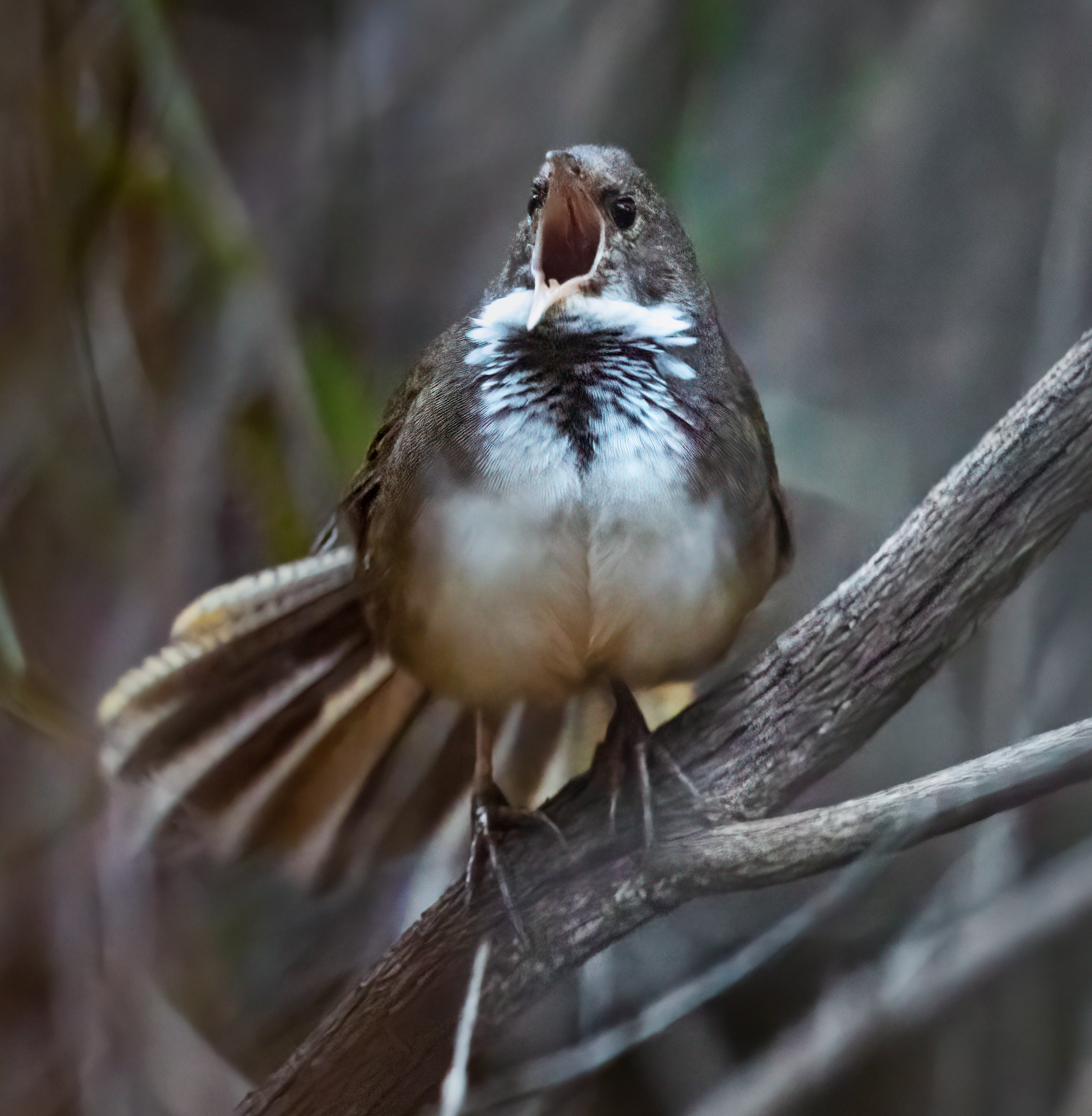

Conservation status
- Endangered (IUCN 3.1)
- CITES Appendix I

Scientific classification
- Kingdom: Animalia
- Phylum: Chordata
- Class: Aves
- Order: Passeriformes
- Family: Atrichornithidae
- Genus: Atrichornis
- Species: A. clamosus

Binomial name
- Atrichornis clamosus (Gould, 1844)

= Noisy scrubbird =

Species of bird

The noisy scrubbird (Atrichornis clamosus) is a species of bird in the family Atrichornithidae. It is endemic to the coastal heaths of south-western Australia (east of Albany).

== Description ==
The noisy scrubbird features a dark brown coloured back, rust-like coloured wings and a speckled chestnut colored breast region with a grey-brown or pink bill and brown or silver legs and feet. They vary from 19–23 cm. in length and 25-58 grams. The males are distinguished from the females by exhibiting a black triangle on their throat . They are closely related to the lyrebird, having only evolutionarily separated from them approximately 30-35 million years ago. They prefer feeding upon small invertebrates, such as ants and beetles, in the extremely dense understory and vegetative cover that only occurs after environmental damages.

== Distribution ==
The noisy scrubbird is one of Australia's rarest birds. It was presumed extinct until a population was discovered at Two Peoples Bay, east of Albany in Western Australia in the 1960s. Since then a recovery plan has been put into action. Populations of the bird have been translocated to nearby Bald Island, in Waychinicup National Park, as well as the Porongorup Ranges, where a bushfire had destroyed much of the population.

In 2025, the total population of birds was estimated at 1,500 individuals. In September 2025 three birds were reintroduced to West Cape Howe National Park where it has not been found since the 1890s.

== Habitat ==
A reason that the noisy scrubbird's populations are so threatened is due to them being a very endemic species with specific living conditions and niche. In addition, they also require very dense leaf litter to feed upon the leaf-degrading invertebrates which they prefer. They typically inhabit areas that have been recovering for approximately 10 years, but there has been reported colonizations as soon as 2 years following the damage. The scrubbird has never been recorded to inhabit an area that has not been burnt or damaged in the previous 50 years. Their known range is approximately 45 km² combined including the Two Peoples Bay and Bald Island populations.

== Reproduction ==
Noisy scrubbirds are sexually mature at approximately 5 years of age for males and the first breeding season for females. Unlike many other birds they lay one egg at a time and have a clutch size of only 2 eggs. The nest is a circular-shaped structure typically built in low-lying shrubbery, rushes or sedges and is made from common sticks, leaves and decaying plant matter. Males play no part in the nest-building, but it is believed they may defend the territory the female has laid her eggs in. The eggs are incubated for approximately 36 days prior to hatching, and then the chicks leave the nest 4–6 weeks after hatching. In a 2005 study there is considered to be approximately 695 individual scrubbirds remaining, and included in that approximation are 278 territorial males. It was presumed that for each territorial male there were 2.5 females

== Conservation ==
The noisy scrubbird is listed on the IUCN Red List as an endangered species. The species was presumed extinct when Edwin Ashby searched unsuccessfully at Ellensbrook (Margaret River) in 1920, although he noted a report by a resident of its call and movements in deep karri forest and anticipated it would be rediscovered in similar habitat.

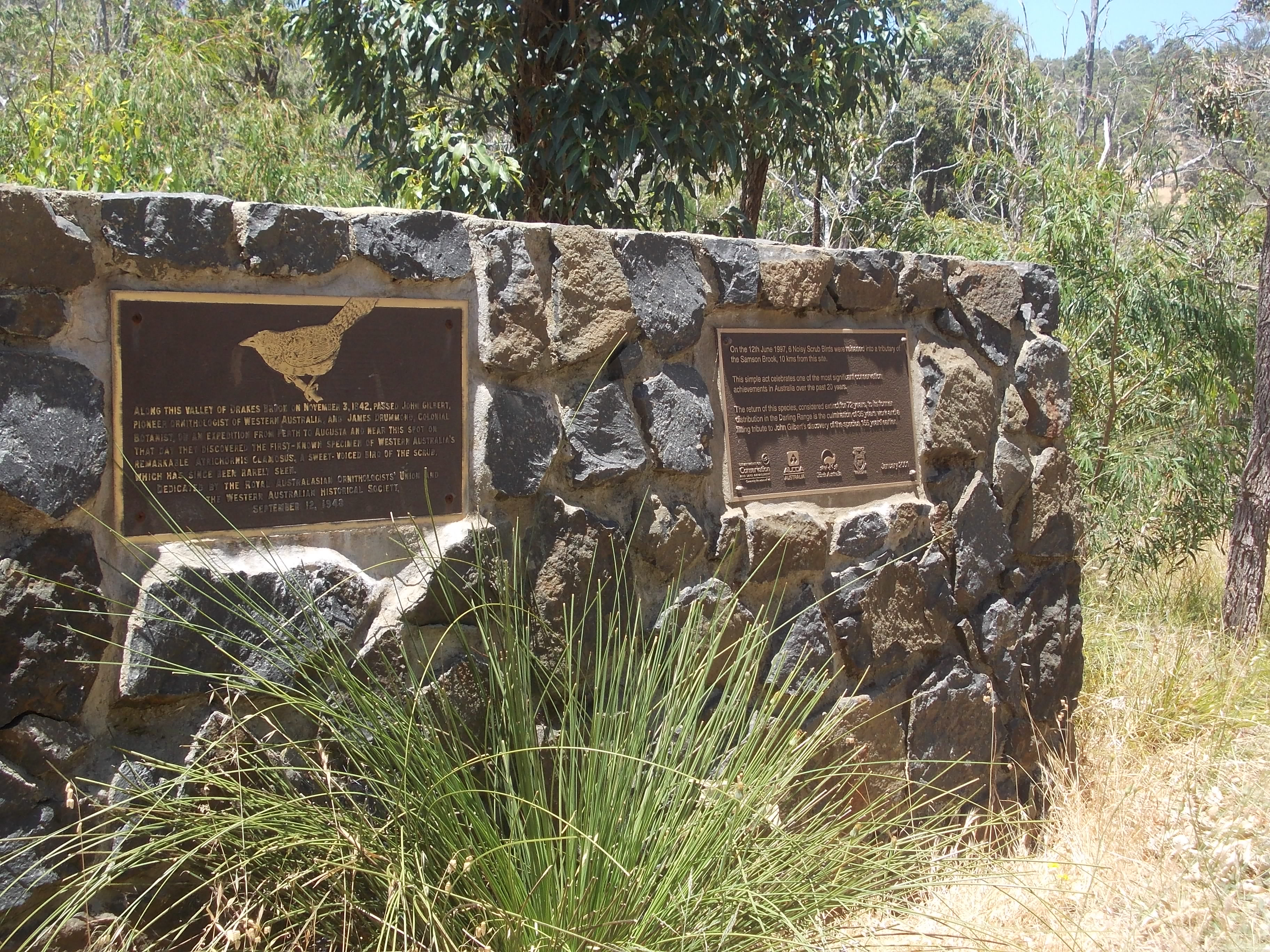
Memorial to "Atrichornis clamosus, a sweet voiced bird of the scrub" at Drakes Brook (Waroona).

The populations of the noisy scrubbird are declining despite 50 years of conservation and management. Major threats include forest fires, predation by introduced species such as foxes, feral cats and black rats, degradation of habitat, soil fungi, introduced mammals, climate change and lack of genetic variation. The management conducted has focused heavily on predation control and gaining data by surveying and radio trackers. While there have been some great successes with the reintroduction and management of the scrubbirds, lightning-induced fires have damaged much of the management progress.

The fungi Phytophthora cinnamomi has become more abundant in the scrubbird's range and has the ability to kill and degrade massive amounts of forest, which can heavily affect the diversity of the forest, and could easily and rapidly displace many of the remaining scrubbirds. Forest dieback due to this fungi has been shown to increase the amount of predators in the area, but has not been proven to have any effect on the scrubbird's populations yet.

Translocations to native ranges have been attempted several times with little success due to the noisy scrubbird requiring a very specific habitat. These translocations even required the removal of all potential predators for the scrubbird, but still had little success.

The best conservation method would be to reintroduce the scrubbird to its native ranges by carefully monitoring the populations and controlling forest fires. A fire event in the few major concentrations of its populations could be detrimental to all previous conservation efforts.
