= Herbert Friedmann =

American ornithologist

- Born: April 22, 1900; Brooklyn, NY
- Died: May 14, 1987 (aged 87); Laguna Hills, CA
- Education: City College of New York; Cornell University, NY (PhD, 1923)
- Scientific career
- Fields: Ornithology

Herbert Friedmann (April 22, 1900 – May 14, 1987) was an American ornithologist. He worked at the Smithsonian Institution for more than 30 years. In 1929 he became a fellow of the American Ornithologists' Union (AOU) and served as the President of the AOU from 1937 to 1939. He published 17 books and was noted for study of Avian brood parasites.

== Early life and education ==
Herbert Friedmann grew up in Brooklyn, New York, the second of four sons. Young Friedman took advantage of educational and cultural opportunities offered in New York City, regularly visiting museums and taking advantage of standing room at the city's centers for performing arts. The Museum of Natural History, the Metropolitan Museum of Art and the Bronx Zoo were among his favorite destinations. He joined a bird club during his high school years and kept detailed notes on birds that he observed. He continued to study birds after entering the City College of New York at 16 years old and maintained a close association with the Museum of Natural History.

While attending City College, Friedmann studied the "Weaving of the Red-Billed Weaver Bird in Captivity" at the Bronx Zoo. That study was later published in Zoologica 2(16):355-72, his first published article. Dr. William Beebe, then Honorary Curator of Birds and Director of the Department of Tropical Research at the zoo, was impressed by the work and encouraged Friedmann to apply for a scholarship to Cornell University. He got the scholarship and completed his PhD in three years. His dissertation was on brood parasitism in cowbirds.

== Career ==
=== Postgraduate work ===
After graduation in 1923, Friedmann taught a summer course for the University of Virginia. For the next three years, he spent most of his time in South America and Africa studying parasitic birds on a postdoctoral grant from the National Research Council and Rockefeller Foundation. He taught courses at Brown University in 1925–1926 and at Amherst College in 1927–1929.

=== Smithsonian museums ===
In September 1929, Friedmann was appointed curator of birds at the National Museum of Natural History and continued to serve in that position until he was appointed as head curator of zoology in 1959.

== Awards ==
In 1955 Friedmann was awarded the Daniel Giraud Elliot Medal from the National Academy of Sciences for his book, The Honey Guides. Friedmann was also awarded the Leidy Award by the Academy of Natural Sciences of Philadelphia that same year. The American Ornithologists' Union awarded the William Brewster Memorial Award to Friedmann in 1964 for "an exceptional body of work on birds of the Western Hemisphere." He received the Quantrell Award.
