= Ficus faulkneriana =

Conservation status
- Vulnerable (IUCN 3.1)

Scientific classification
- Kingdom: Plantae
- Clade: Tracheophytes
- Clade: Angiosperms
- Clade: Eudicots
- Clade: Rosids
- Order: Rosales
- Family: Moraceae
- Genus: Ficus
- Subgenus: F. subg. Urostigma
- Species: F. faulkneriana

Binomial name
- Ficus faulkneriana C.C.Berg

Species of fig

Ficus faulkneriana is a species of strangler fig in the family Moraceae native to Africa.

== Distribution ==
The tree is endemic to coastal Kenya and Tanzania, and in the Usambara Mountains of Tanzania, in tropical East Africa. It is found in coastal woodland and wooded grassland habitats.

== Description ==
The Ficus faulkneriana grows up to 30 metres (98 ft) in height.

It is an IUCN Red Listed Vulnerable species, threatened by habitat loss from land use conversion to agriculture. It is protected within Shimba Hills National Reserve, Gongoni Forest Reserve, and Amani Nature Reserve.

== See also ==
- Flora of East Tropical Africa
- Vulnerable flora of Africa
