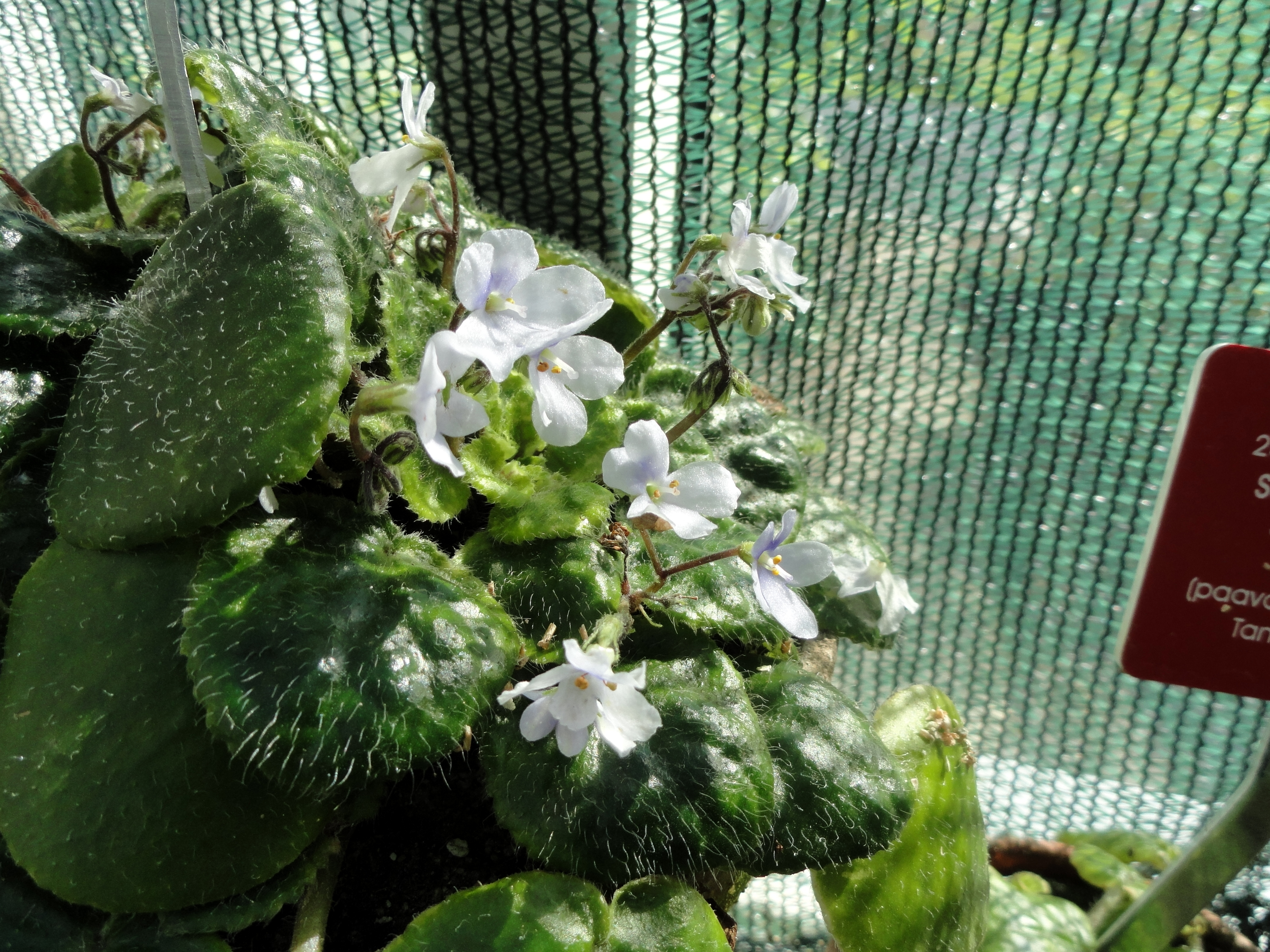

Conservation status
- Endangered (IUCN 3.1)

Scientific classification
- Kingdom: Plantae
- Clade: Tracheophytes
- Clade: Angiosperms
- Clade: Eudicots
- Clade: Asterids
- Order: Lamiales
- Family: Gesneriaceae
- Genus: Streptocarpus
- Section: S. sect. Saintpaulia
- Species: S. shumensis

Binomial name
- Streptocarpus shumensis (B.L.Burtt) Christenh.

Synonyms
- Saintpaulia shumensis B.L.Burtt

= Streptocarpus shumensis =

Species of flowering plant

Streptocarpus shumensis, synonym Saintpaulia shumensis, is a species of Streptocarpus in the section Saintpaulia. It is endemic to Shume in the west Usambara Mountains and also from the northern Nguru Mountains, both in Tanzania, where it grows at elevations of 1,300 to 2,000 meters above sea level.
