= Amani Nature Reserve =

Protected area in Tanga Region, Tanzania

Amani Forest Reserve
- IUCN category IV (habitat/species management area)
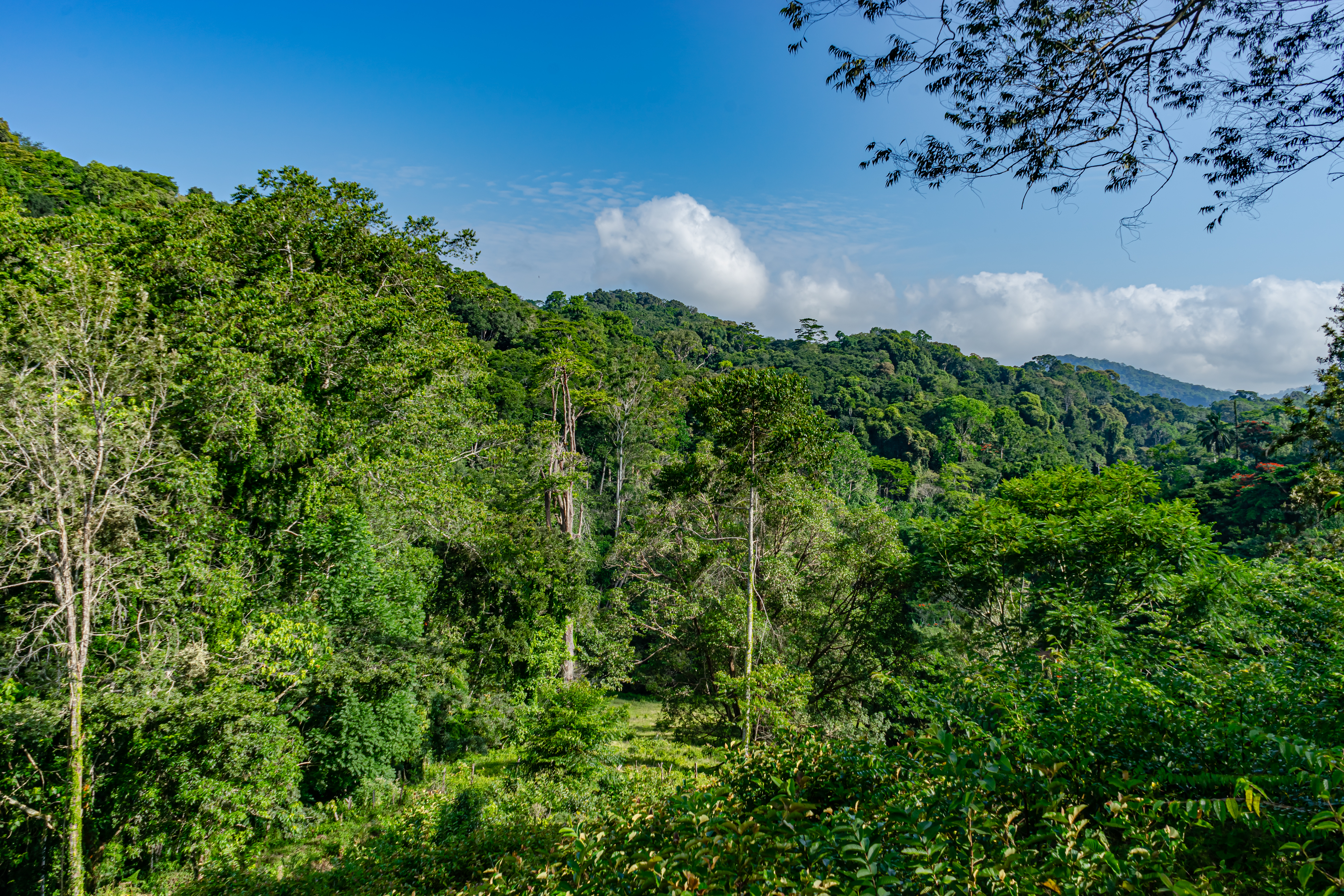
- Amani Forest Reserve

- Location within Tanzania
- Location: Korogwe and Muheza of Tanga Region, Tanzania
- Nearest city: Muheza
- Coordinates: 5°05′S 38°40′E
- Area: 83.04 km^{2} (32.06 mi^{2})
- Designation: Nature Forest Reserve
- Established: 1997
- Named for: Amani means Peace in Swahili
- Governing body: Tanzania Forest Service Agency (TFS) under the Ministry of Natural Resources and Tourism
- Website: Official Page

The Amani Forest Reserve, officially listed as Amani Nature Forest Reserve (Msitu wa Akiba wa Amani, In Swahili) is a forest reserve of Tanzania located the Muheza and Korogwe Districts in the Tanga Region of Tanzania. The nature reserve was established in 1997 in order to preserve the unique flora and fauna of the East Usambara Mountains. The East and West Usambara Mountains are a biodiversity hotspot. The Amani Nature Reserve includes tropical cloud forest habitats.

Amani is home to African violet (Saintpaulia), which are thought to have a spiritual component (power of forgiveness) to the native Shambaa people, has enormous ecological value in the Amani ecosystem. The region is listed as one of the top 12 bird-watching locations in the world by Bird Life International, and the Reserve is a recognized Man and Biosphere Reserve by UNESCO.

== History ==
The Amani Nature Reserve was established in 1997 in a forested area in the East Usambara Mountains with an area of 84 km^{2} (32 mi^{2}), including the Amani Botanical Garden of 3 km^{2} (1.2 mi^{2}) and a further 10.7 km^{2} (4.1 mi^{2}) of forest managed by local tea estates. Traditionally, people living in villages adjacent to the reserve have used the forest as a source of timber, firewood and medicinal plants, a place to gather plants, bush meat, honey and fruit for consumption and a source of live birds, amphibians, reptiles and invertebrates for international trade.

== Flora ==
The forests in the reserve have been described as intermediate evergreen forests or submontane evergreen forest, a type of vegetative cover that tends to grow on the seaward side of both the West and East Usambaras. The dominant trees are Allanblackia stuhlmannii, Isoberlinia scheffleri, Macaranga capensis, Cephalosphaera usambarensis, Myrianthus holstii, Newtonia buchananii and Parinari excelsa.

A growing problem in the area is the presence of the invasive West African tree Maesopsis eminii. This tree germinates readily from seeds which are spread by birds, springs up in gaps in the canopy and outperforms native tree seedlings, displacing rare endemics and reducing biodiversity. The forests of East Usambara have long been separated from other forests and their isolation makes them more vulnerable to invasive species such as M. eminii.

== Fauna ==
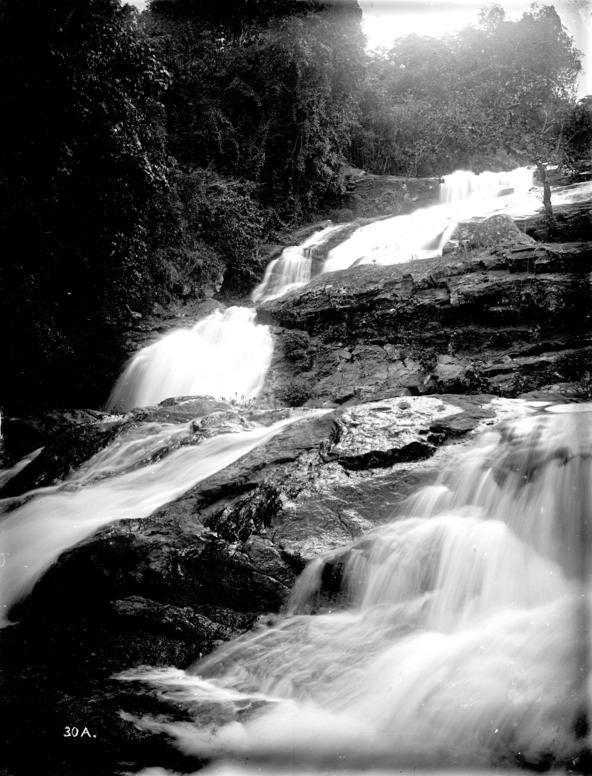
Waterfalls at Amani (1906)

The fauna of the Usambara Mountains has been compared to that of the Galápagos Islands in terms of its richness and biological importance. The area of the Amani Nature Reserve is better studied than many other parts of the range with numerous endemic invertebrates dependent on the native moist forest cover including mites, spiders, freshwater crabs, dragonflies, beetles, butterflies, millipedes and molluscs.

There are few large mammals in the reserve. Duiker and bushpig are plentiful and there are two species of monkey, but the elephants and leopards that used to inhabit the area are no longer present. The elusive long-billed forest warbler (Artisornis moreaui) is known from the reserve and from one other locality, Mount Namuli in northern Mozambique, 1,000 km (600 mi) away.

Some of the endemic animals are named after the mountains in which the nature reserve is set, and these include the Usambara weaver (Ploceus nicolli), Usambara akalat, Usambara hyliota (Hyliota usambara) and the Usambara eagle-owl (Bubo vosseleri). Others are named after the reserve, and these include the Amani sunbird (Hedydipna pallidigaster) and the Amani tailorbird. There are also endemic tree frogs and chameleons unique to the area.

== Amani Hill Research Station ==
Founded in 1902, after World War II the scientific station became famous for its research into malaria. Since the 1970s the laboratory has remained largely unchanged with the specimens and instruments of a long gone by era. As of 2017 the station receives few visitors and the thirty-four staff maintain the entomological collection continuing to add butterflies and other insects.

== Attractions ==
The reserve is endowed with a variety of tourist attractions in addition to Saintpaulia flowers, including endemic species of flora and animals, Unique biodiversity, natural features, and historical and cultural attractions. The reserve is renowned for its diverse bird and butterfly species.

== See also ==
- Flora of East Tropical Africa
- Mkomazi National Park
