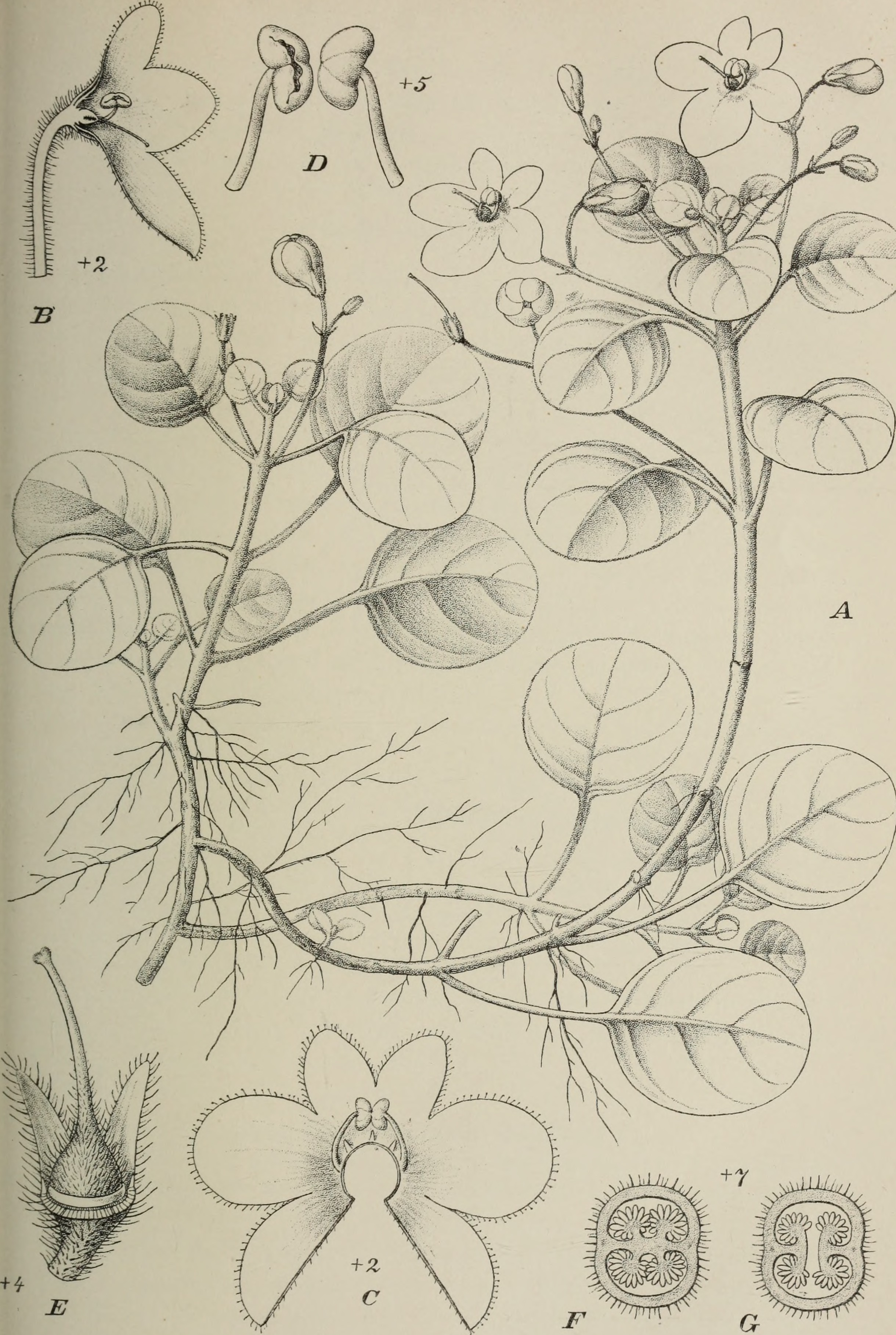

Scientific classification
- Kingdom: Plantae
- Clade: Tracheophytes
- Clade: Angiosperms
- Clade: Eudicots
- Clade: Asterids
- Order: Lamiales
- Family: Gesneriaceae
- Genus: Streptocarpus
- Section: S. sect. Saintpaulia
- Species: S. goetzeanus

Binomial name
- Streptocarpus goetzeanus (Engl.) Christenh.

Synonyms
- Saintpaulia goetzeana Engl.

= Streptocarpus goetzeanus =

Species of flowering plant

Streptocarpus goetzeanus, synonym Saintpaulia goetzeana, is a species of Streptocarpus in the section Saintpaulia, commonly known as an African violet. It is a small, flowering plant that is used widely in home horticulture. S. goetzeana was first collected in 1898 by W. Goetze, and it was later described as a species by Engler in 1900.

== Characteristics ==
Streptocarpus goetzeanus has stems of about 40 cm in length with leaves of 1.6-3.8 cm long and 1.4-3.6 cm wide. The flower is unique to the species. It has five petals, where the top two are violet and the bottom three are white.

== Distribution ==
Members of Streptocarpus section Saintpaulia are native to eastern tropical Africa. There is a concentration of species in the Nguru Mountains of Tanzania. This particular species is only found at the higher elevations of 1300–2000 meters.

== Cultivation ==
Streptocarpus goetzeanus is very hard to cultivate due to the narrow conditions it needs to grow, such as mossy rock surfaces in deep shade. These conditions are hard to reproduce, making cultivation difficult.
