= Streptocarpus albus =

Conservation status
- Endangered (IUCN 3.1)

Scientific classification
- Kingdom: Plantae
- Clade: Tracheophytes
- Clade: Angiosperms
- Clade: Eudicots
- Clade: Asterids
- Order: Lamiales
- Family: Gesneriaceae
- Genus: Streptocarpus
- Section: S. sect. Saintpaulia
- Species: S. albus

Binomial name
- Streptocarpus albus (E.A.Bruce) I.Darbysh.

Synonyms
- Linnaeopsis alba (E.A.Bruce) B.L.Burtt; Saintpaulia alba E.A.Bruce

Species of flowering plant

Streptocarpus albus is a species of flowering plant in the family Gesneriaceae, native to Tanzania. It was first described in 1933 as Saintpaulia alba. It is found in the Uluguru and Nguru mountains of Tanzania.
