= Lerheimia villangulata =

Scientific classification
- Domain: Eukaryota
- Kingdom: Animalia
- Phylum: Arthropoda
- Class: Insecta
- Order: Diptera
- Family: Chironomidae
- Genus: Lerheimia
- Species: L. villangulata

Binomial name
- Lerheimia villangulata Andersen & Sæther, 1993

Species of fly

Lerheimia villangulata is a species of chironomid midge only known from the western Usambara Mountains in Tanzania. It is only separable from its congeners from details of the genitalia.
