= Streptocarpus nitidus =

Scientific classification
- Kingdom: Plantae
- Clade: Embryophytes
- Clade: Tracheophytes
- Clade: Spermatophytes
- Clade: Angiosperms
- Clade: Eudicots
- Clade: Asterids
- Order: Lamiales
- Family: Gesneriaceae
- Genus: Streptocarpus
- Section: S. sect. Saintpaulia
- Species: S. nitidus

Binomial name
- Streptocarpus nitidus (B.L.Burtt) Mich.Möller & Haston

Synonyms
- Saintpaulia nitida B.L.Burtt; Saintpaulia ionantha subsp. nitida (B.L.Burtt) I.Darbysh.; Streptocarpus ionanthus subsp. nitidus (B.L.Burtt) Christenh.

Species of flowering plant

Streptocarpus nitidus is a species of flowering plant in the family Gesneriaceae, native to Tanzania. It was first described in 1958 as Saintpaulia nitida. The former genus Saintpaulia was reduced to Streptocarpus sect. Saintpaulia in 2015, and the species moved to Streptocarpus. Streptocarpus nitidus has also been treated as a subspecies of Streptocarpus ionanthus.
