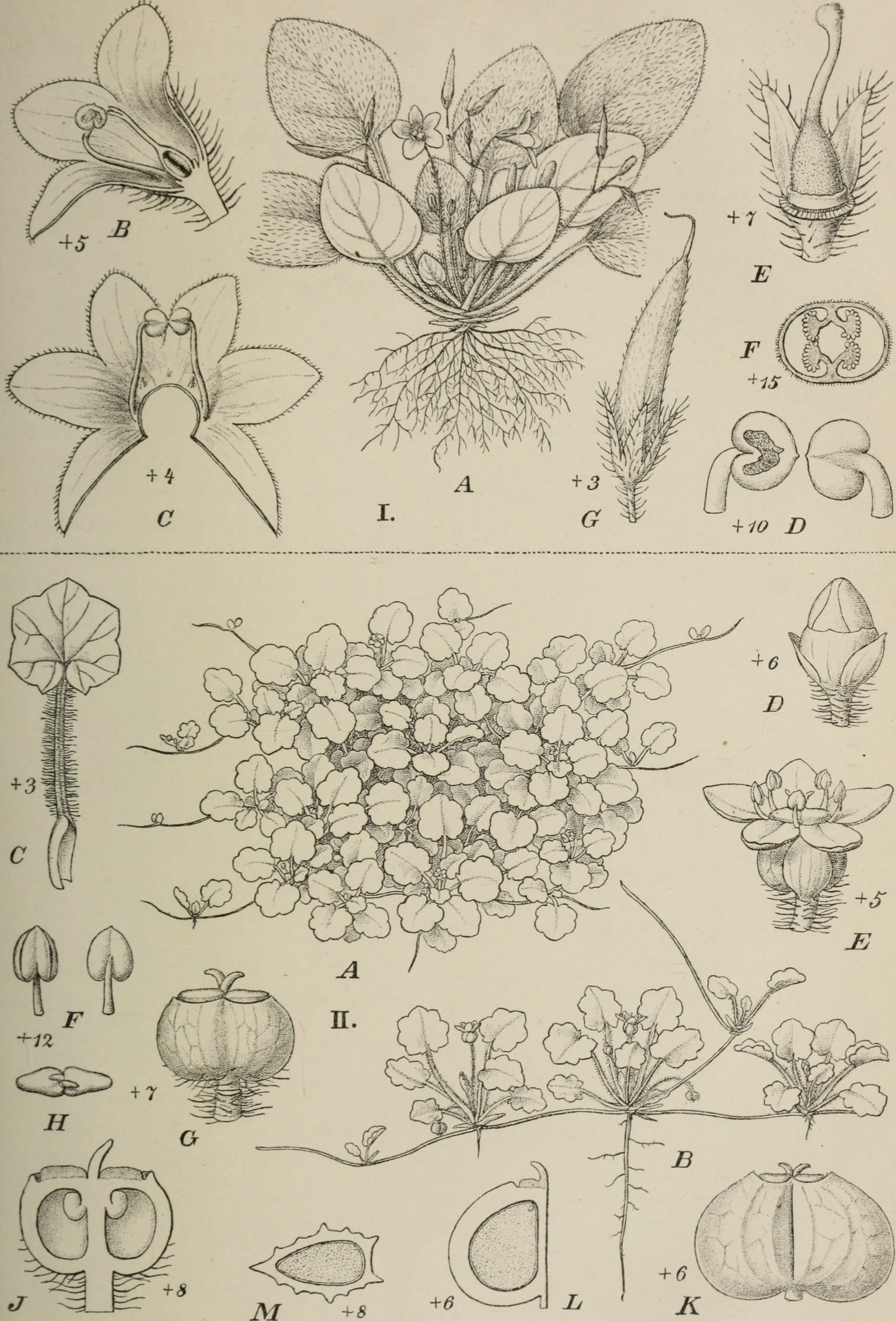
- Illustration of Saintpaulia pusilla (upper portion of image)

Scientific classification
- Kingdom: Plantae
- Clade: Tracheophytes
- Clade: Angiosperms
- Clade: Eudicots
- Clade: Asterids
- Order: Lamiales
- Family: Gesneriaceae
- Genus: Streptocarpus
- Section: S. sect. Saintpaulia
- Species: S. afroviola

Binomial name
- Streptocarpus afroviola Christenh.

Synonyms
- Saintpaulia pusilla Engl.

= Streptocarpus afroviola =

Species of flowering plant

Streptocarpus afroviola, synonym Saintpaulia pusilla, is a species of flowering plant in the family Gesneriaceae, native to Tanzania. It was first described in 1900 by Adolf Engler as Saintpaulia pusilla. The former genus Saintpaulia was reduced to Streptocarpus sect. Saintpaulia, and the species was moved to Streptocarpus. However, the name Streptocarpus pusillus had been used in 1883 for a different species, so Maarten J. M. Christenhusz put forward the replacement name Streptocarpus afroviola.

== Distribution and habitat ==
Streptocarpus afroviola is known from four mountain ranges in Tanzania: the Uluguru, Ukaguru, Nguru and Udzungwa mountains, although it has only been found in a single site on each of the Ukaguru and Nguru Mountains. It grows on shady rockfaces and moss-covered rocks in montane rainforest at elevations of 1,300–1,750 m (4,270–5,740 ft).
