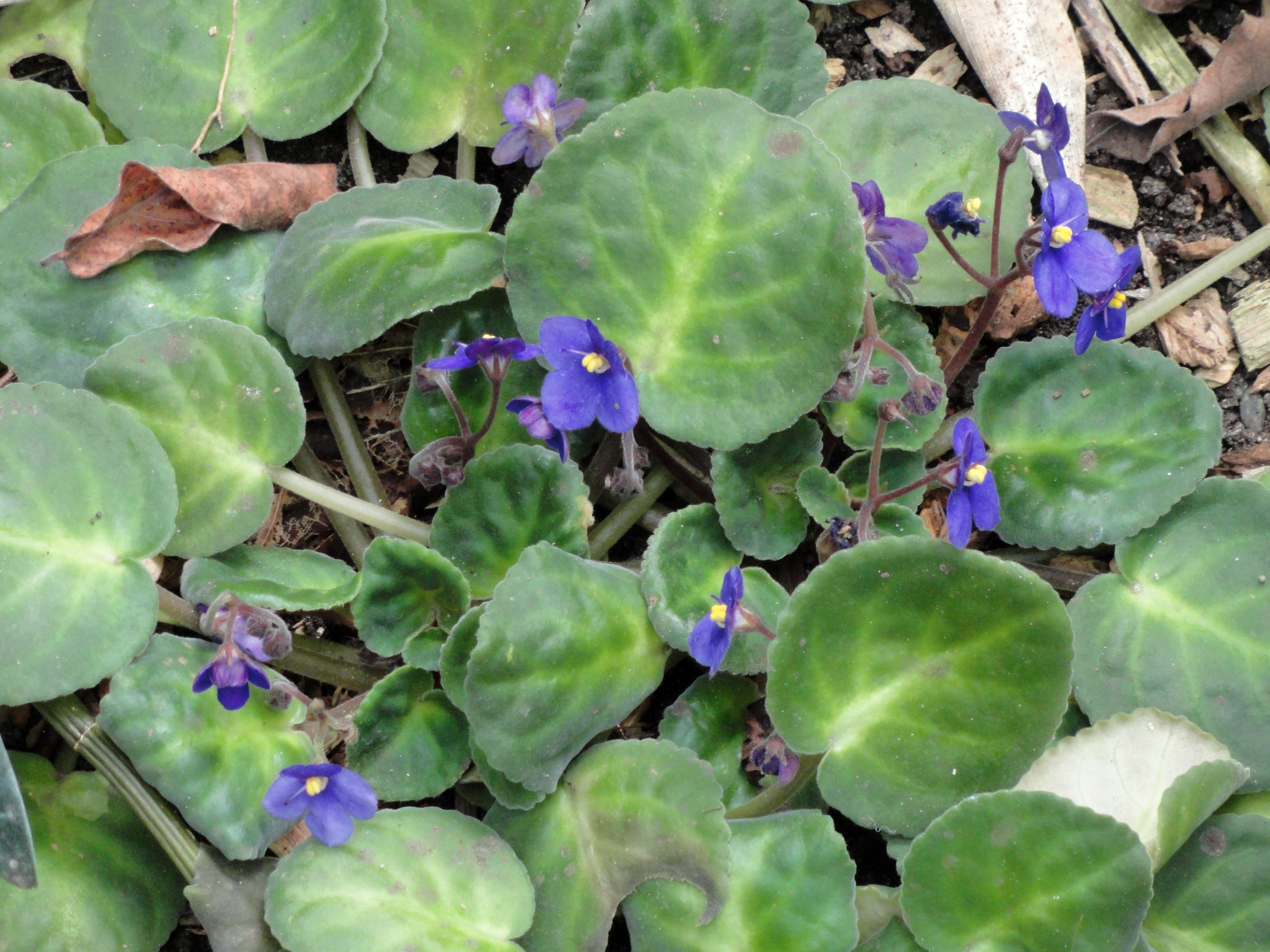

Scientific classification
- Kingdom: Plantae
- Clade: Tracheophytes
- Clade: Angiosperms
- Clade: Eudicots
- Clade: Asterids
- Order: Lamiales
- Family: Gesneriaceae
- Genus: Streptocarpus
- Section: S. sect. Saintpaulia
- Species: S. brevipilosus

Binomial name
- Streptocarpus brevipilosus (B.L.Burtt) Mich.Möller & Haston

Synonyms
- Saintpaulia brevipilosa B.L.Burtt

= Streptocarpus brevipilosus =

Species of flowering plant

Streptocarpus brevipilosus is a species of flowering plant in the family Gesneriaceae, native to Tanzania. It was first described in 1964 as Saintpaulia brevipilosa. The former genus Saintpaulia was reduced to Streptocarpus sect. Saintpaulia in 2015, and the species moved to Streptocarpus. It is found in the Nguru Mountains of Tanzania.
