= Streptocarpus inconspicuus =

Conservation status
- Endangered (IUCN 3.1)

Scientific classification
- Kingdom: Plantae
- Clade: Tracheophytes
- Clade: Angiosperms
- Clade: Eudicots
- Clade: Asterids
- Order: Lamiales
- Family: Gesneriaceae
- Genus: Streptocarpus
- Section: S. sect. Saintpaulia
- Species: S. inconspicuus

Binomial name
- Streptocarpus inconspicuus (B.L.Burtt) Christenh.

Synonyms
- Saintpaulia inconspicua B.L.Burtt

Species of flowering plant

Streptocarpus inconspicuus, synonym Saintpaulia inconspicua, is a species of Streptocarpus in the section Saintpaulia. It is a rare African violet, found in the Uluguru Mountains in Tanzania, East Africa. It was first formally described (in the genus Saintpaulia) in 1958. It is classed as an endangered species by the IUCN Red List.
