= Streptocarpus ulugurensis =

Conservation status
- Critically Endangered (IUCN 3.1)

Scientific classification
- Kingdom: Plantae
- Clade: Embryophytes
- Clade: Tracheophytes
- Clade: Spermatophytes
- Clade: Angiosperms
- Clade: Eudicots
- Clade: Asterids
- Order: Lamiales
- Family: Gesneriaceae
- Genus: Streptocarpus
- Section: S. sect. Saintpaulia
- Species: S. ulugurensis

Binomial name
- Streptocarpus ulugurensis (Haston) Haston

Synonyms
- Saintpaulia ulugurensis Haston

Species of flowering plant

Streptocarpus ulugurensis is a species of flowering plant in the family Gesneriaceae. It is an herbaceous perennial endemic to the Uluguru Mountains of Morogoro Region of Tanzania.

Streptocarpus ulugurensis is known from a single location of only five square meters on the eastern slope of the northern Uluguru Mountains. It grows on a steep mossy bank with ferns and mosses between rocks and tree roots, in the deep shade of submontane forest at 750 metres (2,460 ft) elevation.

It was first described in 2009 as Saintpaulia ulugurensis. The former genus Saintpaulia was reduced to Streptocarpus sect. Saintpaulia in 2015, and the species moved to Streptocarpus.
