= African Violet Society of America =

International association of African violet enthusiasts

- Abbreviation: AVSA
- Formation: November 8, 1946; 79 years ago
- Type: Horticultural society, 501 (c) (3) nonprofit
- Purpose: the culture of African violets
- Publication: African Violet Magazine

The African Violet Society of America (AVSA) is an international society of plant enthusiasts who promote the cultivation of African violets (Streptocarpus sect. Saintpaulia species and cultivars) as house plants. The Society hosts an annual convention and publishes a bi-monthly full-color 64-page magazine, the African Violet Magazine.

== History ==
The African Violet Society of America Inc. was organized on November 8, 1946, and incorporated on June 30, 1947. Since then it has grown to be the largest society devoted to a single indoor plant in the world. It is a 501(c)(3) charitable organization.

== Objectives ==
The purposes of AVSA are:

- to provide a convenient association for people interested in African violets;
- to stimulate interest in propagation and culture of African violets;
- to promote distribution of all varieties and species among members and others interested in growing them;
- to publish reliable, practical information about plants and the organization.

== Membership ==
AVSA membership, which includes both amateur and commercial growers, spans the globe. There are national groups in many countries of the world. The purposes of AVSA are carried out, in part, by a strong network of affiliate clubs, state and regional societies, councils of societies, and judges councils. The AVSA sponsors African violet shows staged at the AVSA conventions and by AVSA affiliates. In these shows, plants are merit-judged according to the appropriate AVSA scales of points by AVSA judges.

AVSA is the International Cultivar Registration Authority for the former genus Saintpaulia (now Streptocarpus sect. Saintpaulia) and its cultivars. This registry is available to the public with the purchase of updatable software.
