= Lerheimia =

Scientific classification
- Domain: Eukaryota
- Kingdom: Animalia
- Phylum: Arthropoda
- Class: Insecta
- Order: Diptera
- Family: Chironomidae
- Subfamily: Orthocladiinae
- Genus: Lerheimia; Andersen & Sæther, 1993

Species
- Lerheimia aviculata Lerheimia scopulata Lerheimia villangulata Lerheimia wulfi

Genus of flies

Lerheimia is a genus of chironomid midges containing four described species found in Tanzania and the Democratic Republic of the Congo.

These are small chironomids (wing length 0.8 - 1.3 mm) with bare, protruding eyes, and distinctive wing venation with extended costa and down-curved anal vein.
