= Millettia sacleuxii =

Conservation status
- Endangered (IUCN 3.1)

Scientific classification
- Kingdom: Plantae
- Clade: Tracheophytes
- Clade: Angiosperms
- Clade: Eudicots
- Clade: Rosids
- Order: Fabales
- Family: Fabaceae
- Subfamily: Faboideae
- Genus: Millettia
- Species: M. sacleuxii

Binomial name
- Millettia sacleuxii Dunn

Species of legume

Millettia sacleuxii is a species of plant in the family Fabaceae. It is endemic to the Eastern Arc forests of Tanzania, where it occurs in the Nguru and Usambara Mountains. It was once feared extinct, but has been cultivated in fair quantities since its rediscovery.
