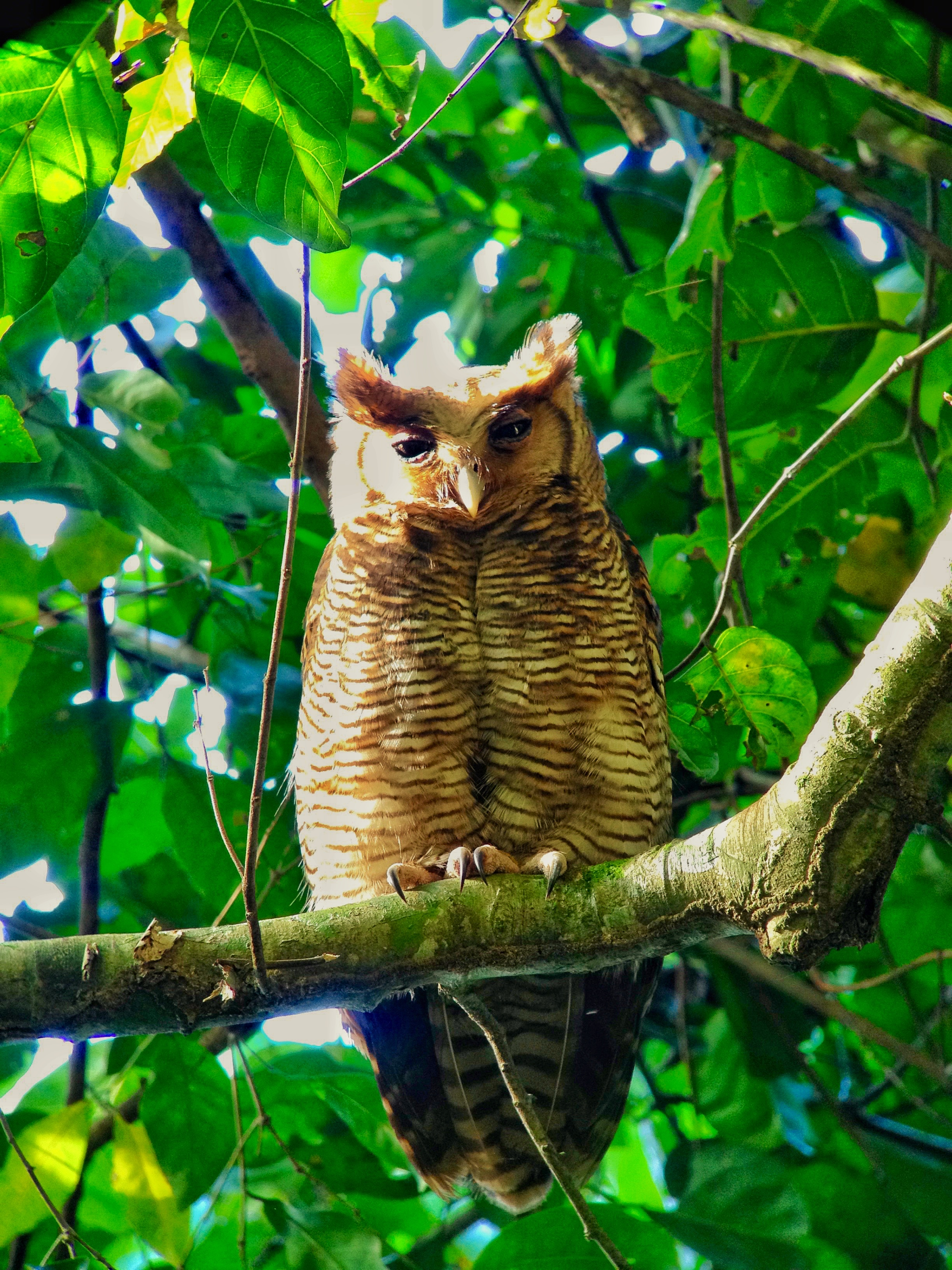

Conservation status
- Least Concern (IUCN 3.1)
- CITES Appendix II

Scientific classification
- Kingdom: Animalia
- Phylum: Chordata
- Class: Aves
- Order: Strigiformes
- Family: Strigidae
- Genus: Ketupa
- Species: K. poensis

Binomial name
- Ketupa poensis (Fraser, 1854)

Synonyms
- Bubo fasciolatus Hartlaub 1855

Audio
- Sound recorded in Liberia

= Fraser's eagle-owl =

Species of owl

Fraser's eagle-owl (Ketupa poensis) is a species of African owl in the family Strigidae. It is named after the British zoologist Louis Fraser.

== Taxonomy ==
Fraser's eagle-owl was formally described in 1854 by British zoologist and collector Louis Fraser based on a specimen collected on the island of Bioko (formerly Fernando Po) off the coast of West Africa. Fraser placed the owl in the genus Bubo and coined the binomial name Bubo poensis. The specific name poensis is from the locality Fernando Po. Fraser's eagle-owl is now one of twelve species placed in the genus Ketupa that was introduced in 1831 by the French naturalist René Lesson.

Two subspecies are recognised:

- K. p. poensis (Fraser, 1854) – Sierra Leone to Uganda central DR Congo and north Angola
- K. p. vosseleri (Reichenow, 1908) – northeast Tanzania

The subspecies K. p. vosseleri has sometimes been treated as a separate species, the Usambara eagle-owl.

== Description ==
Fraser's eagle-owl is a relatively small species of eagle-owl that has rather "fluffy" ear-tufts and a facial disc with a distinct dark rim. The upperparts are rufous and buffy brown, barred with darker bars, the pale scapulars have dark-edged outer webs which show as a series of pale dots across the shoulder. The flight and tail feathers have narrow light and dark bars. The underparts are pale rufous shading to whitish on the belly and undertail coverts. Total length is 39–42 cm (15–17 in), with the females being larger than males. Compared with the nominate the subspecies K. p. vosseleri has heavier blotching on the breast and more widely spaced barring on the underparts.

=== Vocalization ===
The territorial song of the male Fraser's eagle-owl is a rapid, stuttering and long deep, guttural trill which has been said to resemble the noise made by an electricity generator. There is also a two syllable hoot, which is stereotypically owl-like, with the second syllable being higher pitched and more whistled. The double hoot is repeated at intervals of 3–4 seconds, and to the listener familiar with it, similar to the hoot of the European tawny owl. Another call, which is given by both sexes, is a single soft mewing "wooh". They snap their bills to communicate, as do many owls. The calls of K. p. vosseleri are not significantly different to those of the nominate form.

== Distribution and habitat ==
It is widely spread across the African tropical rainforest; also found on Bioko. Their habitat is primarily forest, forest clearings, and cardamom plantations. They range from sea-level up to about 1,600 m (5,200 ft), in Cameroon.

== Behaviour and ecology ==
Like most owls Fraser's eagle-owl is a nocturnal bird, roosting during the day hidden by leaves, about 40 m (130 ft) above the ground. The roost site is often located by small, diurnal birds which mob the owl. The birds stop roosting at dusk and become active. Singing is most often in the early evening and just after dusk, but they will also sing just before dawn. Its main prey is small mammals, such as mice, squirrels and galagos, and it also takes birds, frogs, reptiles, insects and other arthropods as well as occasionally feeding on fruit.

The breeding biology of Fraser's eagle-owl is little known. In Gabon they are reported as singing in June–September but breeding seems to take place throughout the year, apparently varying geographically with egg-laying being recorded in February in Liberia, through to December in Uganda and Democratic Republic of Congo. As nestlings have been found on the ground then it has been suggested that Fraser's eagle-owl may nest on the ground; however, there has been at least one record of a nestling observed in a tree cavity. The eggs are white with no markings. The juveniles are apparently dependent on the adults for a long time and retain their juvenile plumage for about a year.
