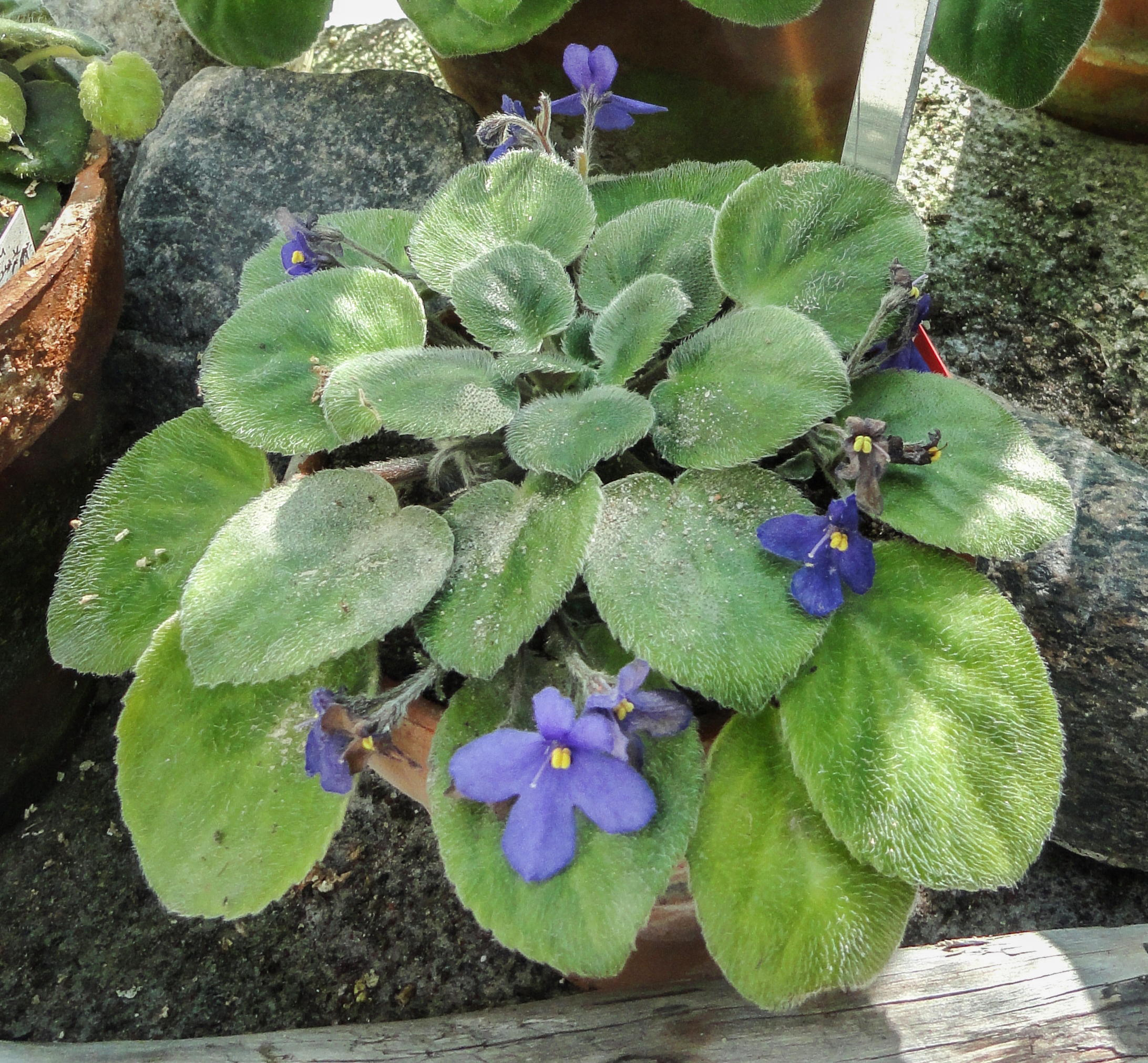
- In cultivation

Conservation status
- Critically Endangered (IUCN 3.1)

Scientific classification
- Kingdom: Plantae
- Clade: Tracheophytes
- Clade: Angiosperms
- Clade: Eudicots
- Clade: Asterids
- Order: Lamiales
- Family: Gesneriaceae
- Genus: Streptocarpus
- Section: S. sect. Saintpaulia
- Species: S. teitensis

Binomial name
- Streptocarpus teitensis (B.L.Burtt) Christenh.

Synonyms
- Saintpaulia teitensis B.L.Burtt

= Streptocarpus teitensis =

Species of flowering plant

Streptocarpus teitensis, synonym Saintpaulia teitensis, is a species of Streptocarpus in the section Saintpaulia. It is endemic to 1 square kilometer on Mbololo Hill in the Taita Hills of southern Kenya. The total population is estimated at less than 2,500 individual plants in the wild.
