= Lerheimia wulfi =

Scientific classification
- Domain: Eukaryota
- Kingdom: Animalia
- Phylum: Arthropoda
- Class: Insecta
- Order: Diptera
- Family: Chironomidae
- Genus: Lerheimia
- Species: L. wulfi

Binomial name
- Lerheimia wulfi Freeman, 1956

Species of fly

Lerheimia wulfi is a species of chironomid midge found in the Democratic Republic of the Congo. It is only separable from its congeners from details of the genitalia.

It has previously been placed in the genera Smittia and Pseudosmittia.
