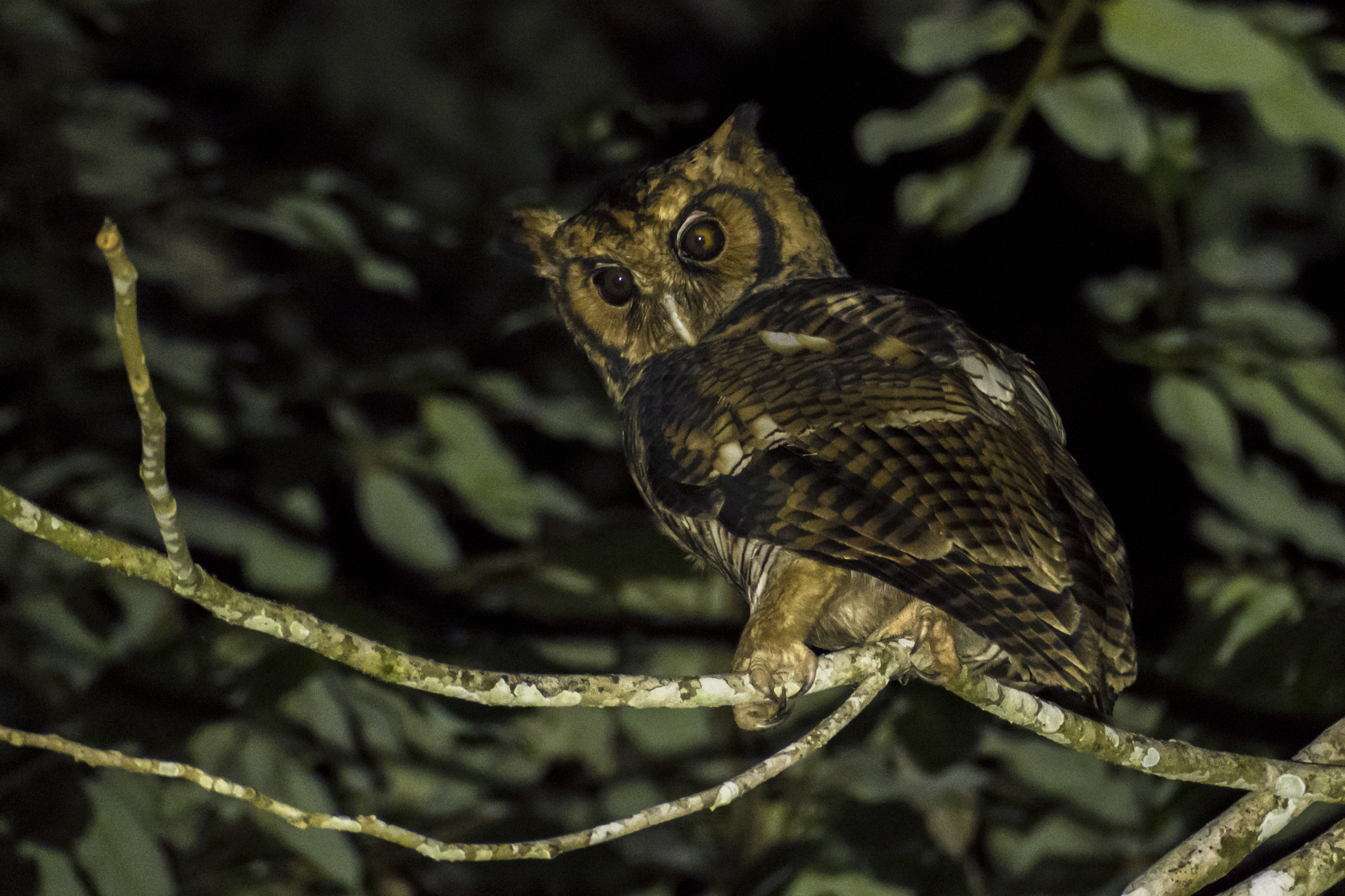

Conservation status
- CITES Appendix II

Scientific classification
- Kingdom: Animalia
- Phylum: Chordata
- Class: Aves
- Order: Strigiformes
- Family: Strigidae
- Genus: Ketupa
- Species: K. poensis
- Subspecies: K. p. vosseleri

Trinomial name
- Ketupa poensis vosseleri Reichenow, 1908

= Usambara eagle-owl =

Subspecies of owl

The Usambara eagle-owl, also called the East African nduk eagle-owl or Vosseier's eagle-owl, (Ketupa poensis vosseleri) is a taxon of owl in the family Strigidae. It is now regarded as a subspecies of Fraser's eagle-owl (Bubo poensis). It is endemic to the Usambara Mountains in Tanga Region of Tanzania.

== Description ==
The Usumbara eagle-owl is a large owl with tawny brown upperparts which are barred with darker brown and creamy white underparts, with brown blotches on the breast and irregular black bars on the belly. The facial disc is pale tawny with broad black borders at the sides, the long ear tufts are tawny brown. The bill is bluish white and the eyes a dull yellowish orange with bluish white eyelids, while the legs and feet are whitish. The juvenile resembles the adult but has a white line along the scapulars. The length (including the tail) is 490 mm (19 in). The differences between this taxon and Fraser's eagle-owl are that it is slightly larger, a more prominent dark margin to the facial disc, denser darker blotching on the breast and fainter markings on the rest of the underparts.

== Distribution and habitat ==
The Usambara eagle-owl is endemic to Tanzania where it occurs in the Usambara Mountains in the north east, recently discovered in the Uluguru Mountains and there has been a possible sighting in the Nguru Mountains.

Its natural habitats are subtropical or tropical moist montane forests between 900 and 1,500 m (3,000 and 4,900 ft) above sea level. It is threatened by habitat loss.

== Taxonomy ==
The latest view of Birdlife International and the IUCN is that Ketupa poensis vosseleri is to be treated as a subspecies of Fraser's eagle-owl as the plumage and vocal differences between the two taxa are very slight. The IOC and the Clements taxonomy, however, treat it as a separate species.
