= Walter von Saint Paul-Illaire =

German colonial official in East Africa

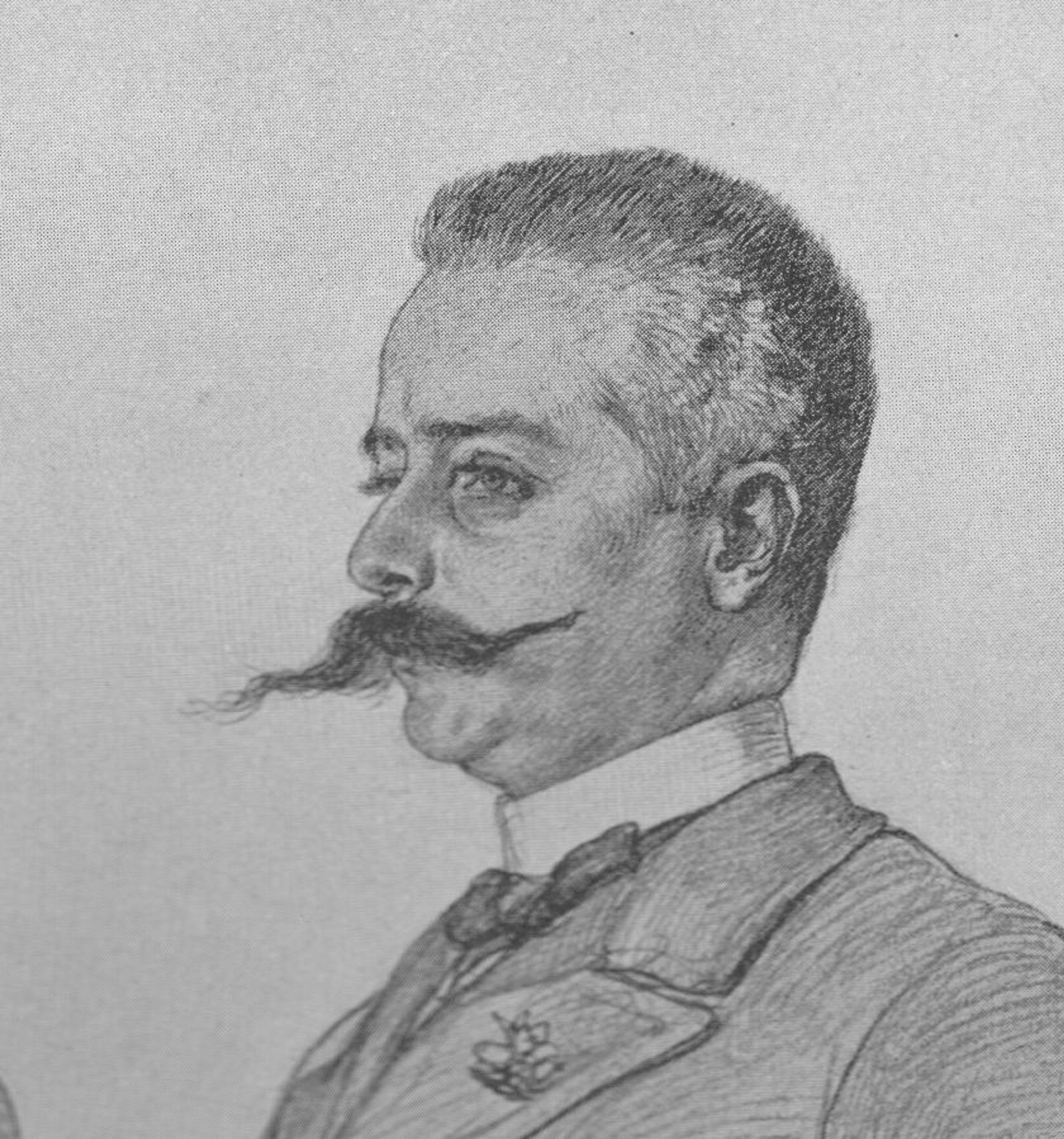
St. Paul-Illaire (Allers)

Walter von Saint Paul-Illaire or Adalbert Emil Walter Le Tanneux von Saint Paul-Illaire (born 1860; died 1940) was a German colonial official in East Africa. He hailed from the noble family of Le Tanneux von Saint Paul, which had moved to Prussia in the 17th century. The genus Saintpaulia of the African violet was named in his honour after he discovered it in the Usambara Mountains and had sent its seeds in 1893 to Hermann Wendland, the German botanist and Chief Royal gardener at the Herrenhausen Gardens in Hanover, who gave the plant its first description, calling it the Usambara veilchen ('Usambara violet').

== Life ==
Walter von Saint Paul-Illaire, was born on January 12, 1860, in Berlin, Kingdom of Prussia. He was the son of the naval officer and member of the Reichstag, Ulrich von Saint Paul-Illaire (1833-1902), was promoted to lieutenant in the Prussian army. His father was very interested in trees, especially firs, and corresponded with George Engelmann, the Missouri physician and botanist, about his wish to introduce and exploit the economic potential of Abies Engelmannii (Picea Engelmannii), or the Engelmann spruce. It is highly likely that Walter, his son, inherited his passion for botany.

In 1885 Walter von Saint Paul-Illaire joined the private German East Africa Company. In January 1886 he took part in an expedition to what is now Kenya for the society. He then became director of customs and, in 1889, general agent of the German East Africa Company in Zanzibar. In 1891 the German Reich took over the administration of German East Africa and Saint Paul-Illaire became a district official in Tanga. He was district officer there from 1891 to 1900. It was during this time that he noticed a plant while walking among the rocks near Tanga, and among the nearby Usambara Mountains. He called it a violet because of its blue flowers. The species name, ionantha, is derived from the Greek, 'ίον', for violet, and 'άνθος', which means flower. Nowadays the plant is included within the genus Streptocarpus, as Streptocarpus sect. Saintpaulia

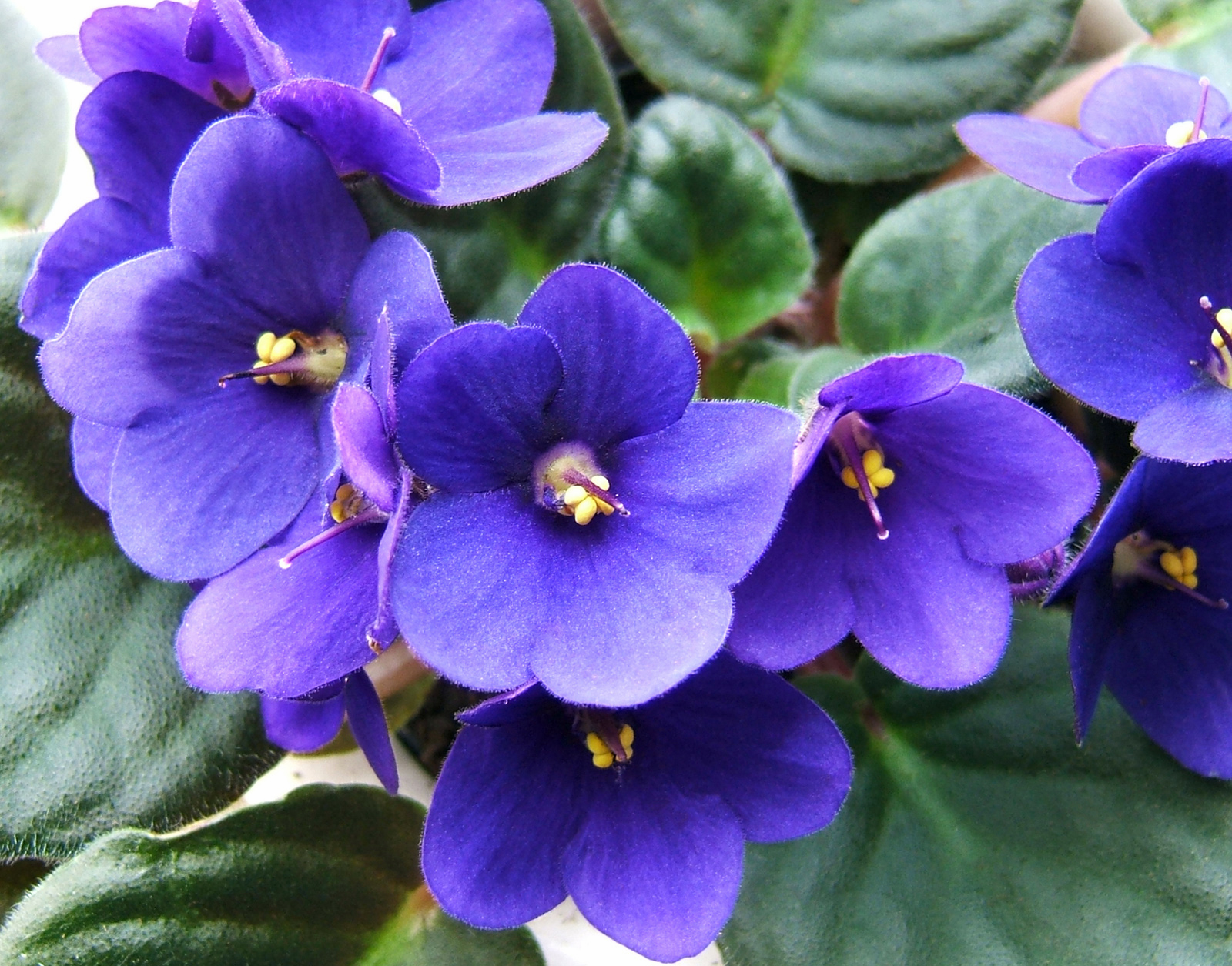
Saintpaulia ionantha

In his colonial role, he was active in the labour issues of the colony of German East Africa and also argued for the exclusion of Indians from the colony because of their near monopoly of trade with the Africans. Saint Paul-Illaire was on the colonial staff of the Cologne daily newspaper, Kölnische Zeitung, the founder and head of the East Africa company, and founding member of the colonial branch of the German Agricultural Society. In 1896 he published a dictionary of Swahili in 1896, as listed below in his publications. After the First World War, he addressed the American and British delegates at the Paris Peace Conference (1919–1920) asking for restitution of the German colonies, writing under the pseudonym of 'Africanus'. He also wrote for scientific publications.

From 1912, Walter von Saint Paul-Illaire became a member of the Berlin Masonic Lodge, Zum Widder. He died in Berlin in 1940 and was buried in the Invalids' Cemetery (German: Invalidenfriedhof), but his grave has not been preserved. The African violet he "discovered" only became popular as a houseplant after his death.

== Works ==
- Swahili-Sprachführer. Daresalaam 1896.
- Kriegs-Xenien: Stimmen und Stimmungen aus dem Weltkriege. Leipzig 1919.
- Der Fluch der deutschen „Gewissenhaftigkeit“. Berlin 1921.
