= Witu Forest =

Nature reserve in Kenya

- Location within Kenya
- Location: Kenya, Lamu District
- Nearest city: Lamu
- Coordinates: 02°22′50″S 40°30′20″E
- Area: 11,463 acres (46.39 km^{2})
- Established: 1927

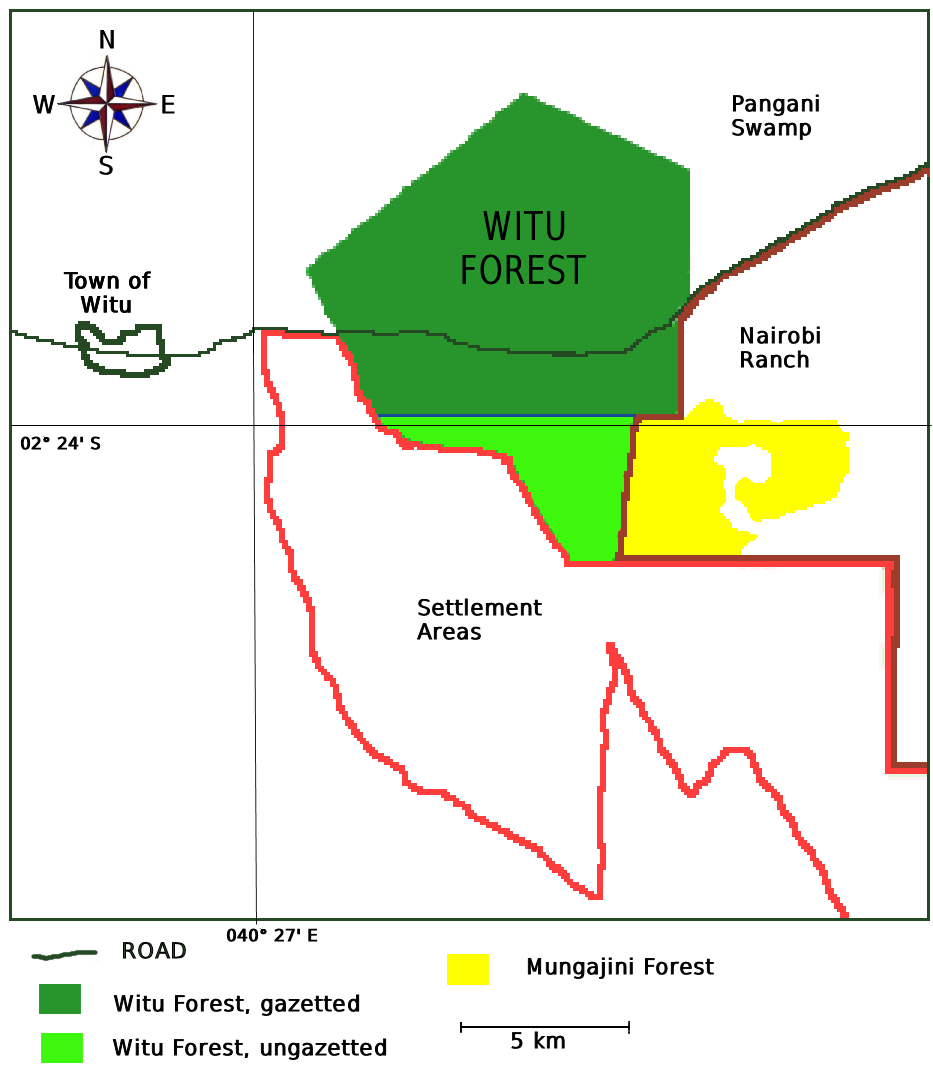
Map of Witu Forest, Lamu District, Kenya

The Witu Forest, is a protected area in Lamu District, Kenya, East Africa. It was formed in 1927 by combining the Utwani Forest Reserve with the adjacent Gongoni Forest Reserve, although the previous names remained in use. The independent Kenyan government confirmed the reservation, gazetting the forest in 1962, with 701 hectares (1,732 acres) more gazetted in 2002. The forest covers 4,639 hectares (11,463 acres) of gazetted land, with approximately 900 hectares (2,224 acres) of additional ungazetted, but enclosed, forest. The adjacent Mungajini Forest on the Nairobi Ranch contains approximately 1,100 hectares (2,718 acres). As of 2007, there was no management plan for the forest, although it is to be managed under the Forests Act, 2005, by the Kenya Forest Service (KFS) which replaced the prior Forest Department in 2005.

== Geography ==
The Witu Forest is bounded to the northeast, and east, by the Pangani Swamp and to the east and southeast by the Nairobi Ranch, including the Mungajini Forest. To the south and southwest it is bordered by Witu settlement areas. The settlement areas were established in 1995 for agricultural development for the local people.

== Issues ==
In 2004 illegal logging in Witu Forest was reported as being extensive, and a much more serious problem than local hunting for bushmeat. Illegal logging continued and was noted still in 2011. Journalist Abdalla Burja wrote: "There is also the issue of the Witu Forest which is being deforested/destroyed by these new migrants in full knowledge of officials as well as Wangari Mathaai’s Green Belt Movement. No action is being taken by the government or by environmental organizations to stop this destruction."

Euphorbia tanaensis is a critically endangered plant found in the Witu Forest Reserve where there are only 20 mature plants according to the IUCN Red List of Threatened Species (IUCN 2009). Although the forest is a reserve and is therefore legally protected, this has not accorded adequate protection to this and other endangered tree species that it hosts.

— National Environment Management Authority (Kenya), Part 2: State of the Environment – Chapter 4: Biodiversity
