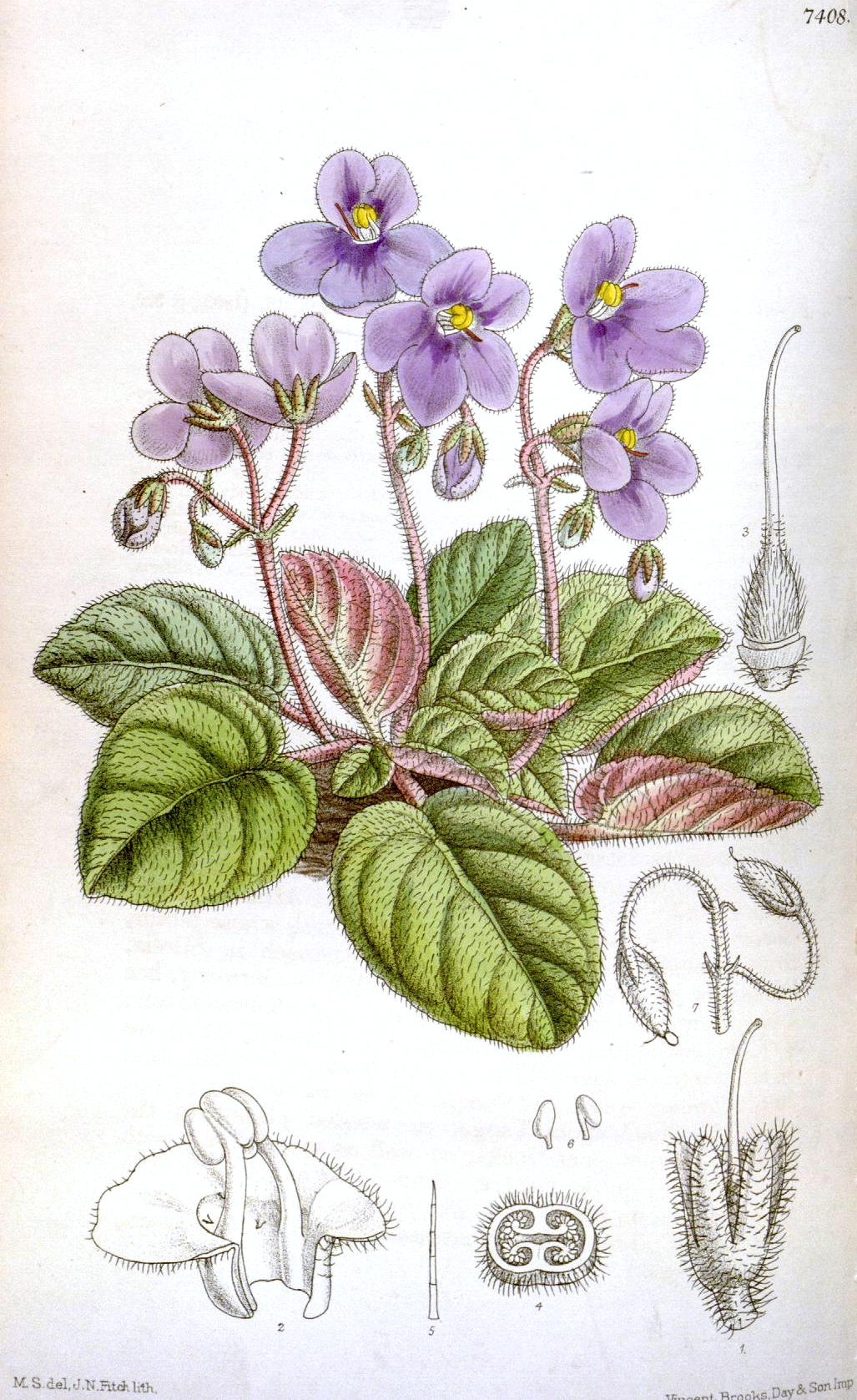
- 1895 illustration

Conservation status
- Near Threatened (IUCN 3.1)

Scientific classification
- Kingdom: Plantae
- Clade: Tracheophytes
- Clade: Angiosperms
- Clade: Eudicots
- Clade: Asterids
- Order: Lamiales
- Family: Gesneriaceae
- Genus: Streptocarpus
- Section: S. sect. Saintpaulia
- Species: S. ionanthus

Binomial name
- Streptocarpus ionanthus (H.Wendl.) Christenh.

Subspecies and varieties
- See text

Synonyms
- Petrocosmea ionantha (H.Wendl.) Baill.; Saintpaulia ionantha H.Wendl.; Saintpaulia kewensis C.B.Clarke; Saintpaulia tongwensis B.L.Burtt

= Streptocarpus ionanthus =

Species of flowering plant

Streptocarpus ionanthus (synonym Saintpaulia ionantha) is a species of Streptocarpus in the section Saintpaulia, commonly known as an African violet. It is native to eastern and southwestern Tanzania.

== Infraspecific taxa ==
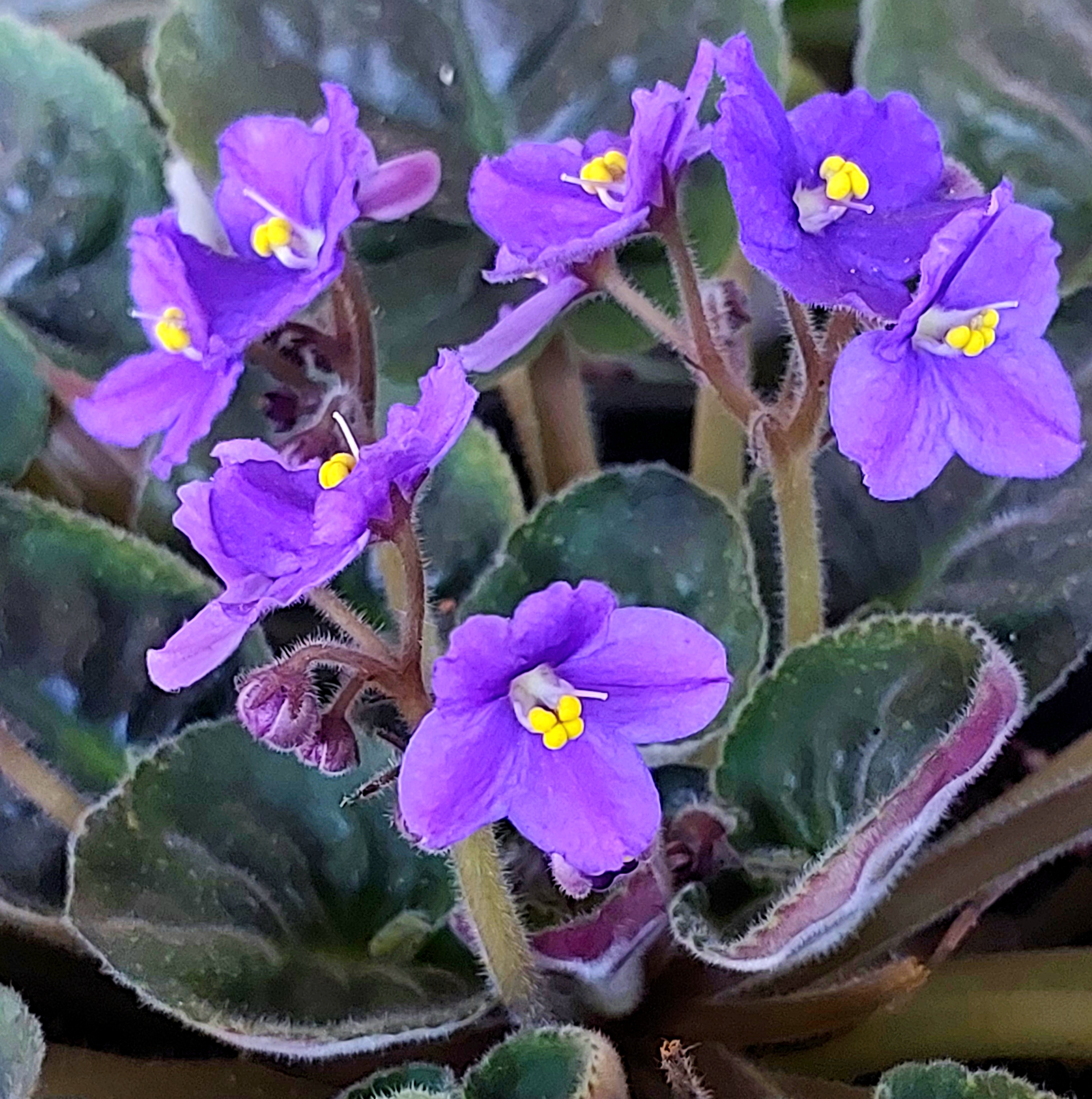
Streptocarpus ionanthus (H.Wendl.) Christenh.

As of March 2020, Plants of the World Online accepted the following subspecies and varieties. Many have previously been treated as separate species in the no longer recognized genus Saintpaulia.

- Streptocarpus ionanthus var. diplotrichus (B.L.Burtt) Christenh. (syn. Saintpaulia diplotricha)
- Streptocarpus ionanthus subsp. grandifolius (B.L.Burtt) Christenh. (syn. Saintpaulia grandifolia)
- Streptocarpus ionanthus subsp. grotei (Engl.) Christenh. (syn. Saintpaulia amaniensis, Saintpaulia confusa, Saintpaulia difficilis, Saintpaulia grotei, Saintpaulia magungensis)
- Streptocarpus ionanthus subsp. mafiensis (I.Darbysh. & Pócs) Christenh.
- Streptocarpus ionanthus subsp. occidentalis (B.L.Burtt) Christenh.
- Streptocarpus ionanthus subsp. orbicularis (B.L.Burtt) Christenh. (syn. Saintpaulia orbicularis)
- Streptocarpus ionanthus subsp. pendulus (B.L.Burtt) Christenh. (syn. Saintpaulia intermedia, Saintpaulia pendula)
- Streptocarpus ionanthus subsp. rupicola (B.L.Burtt) Christenh. (syn. Saintpaulia rupicola)
- Streptocarpus ionanthus subsp. velutinus (B.L.Burtt) Christenh. (syn. Saintpaulia velutina)

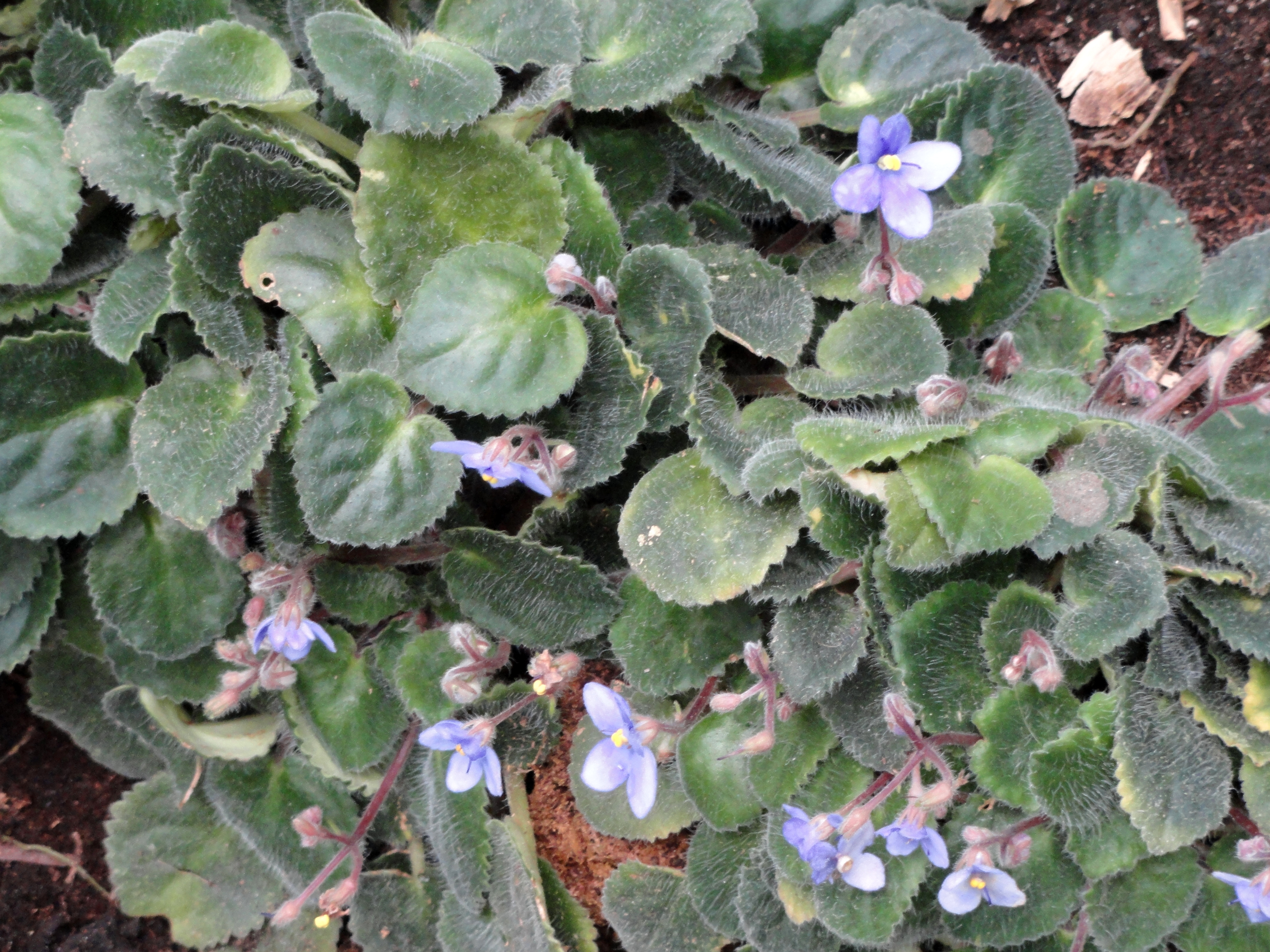
S. ionanthus subsp. velutinus at the Copenhagen Botanical Garden
