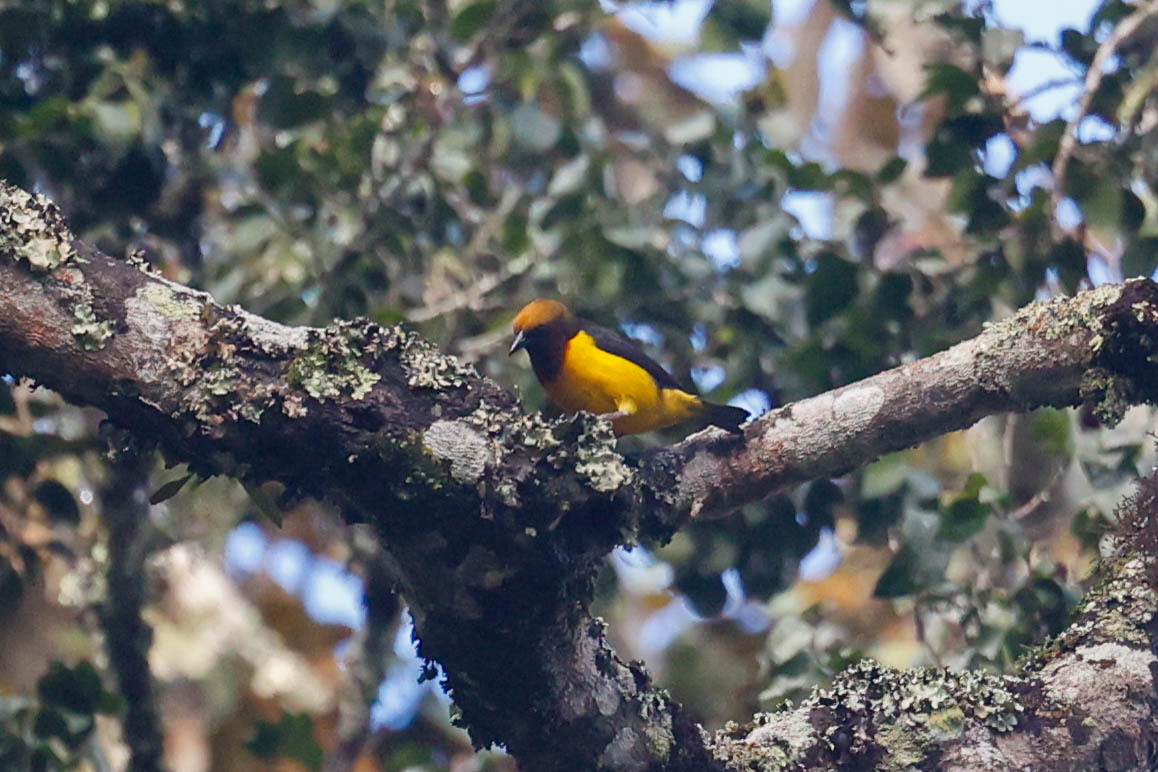

Conservation status
- Near Threatened (IUCN 3.1)

Scientific classification
- Kingdom: Animalia
- Phylum: Chordata
- Class: Aves
- Order: Passeriformes
- Family: Ploceidae
- Genus: Ploceus
- Species: P. nicolli

Binomial name
- Ploceus nicolli WL Sclater, 1931

= Usambara weaver =

Species of bird

The Usambara weaver (Ploceus nicolli) is a species of bird in the family Ploceidae. It is endemic to Tanzania.

Its natural habitats are subtropical or tropical moist montane forests and plantations . It is threatened by habitat loss.
