= Usambara Mountains =

Mountain range in Tanzania

Coordinates: 4°45′S 38°30′E

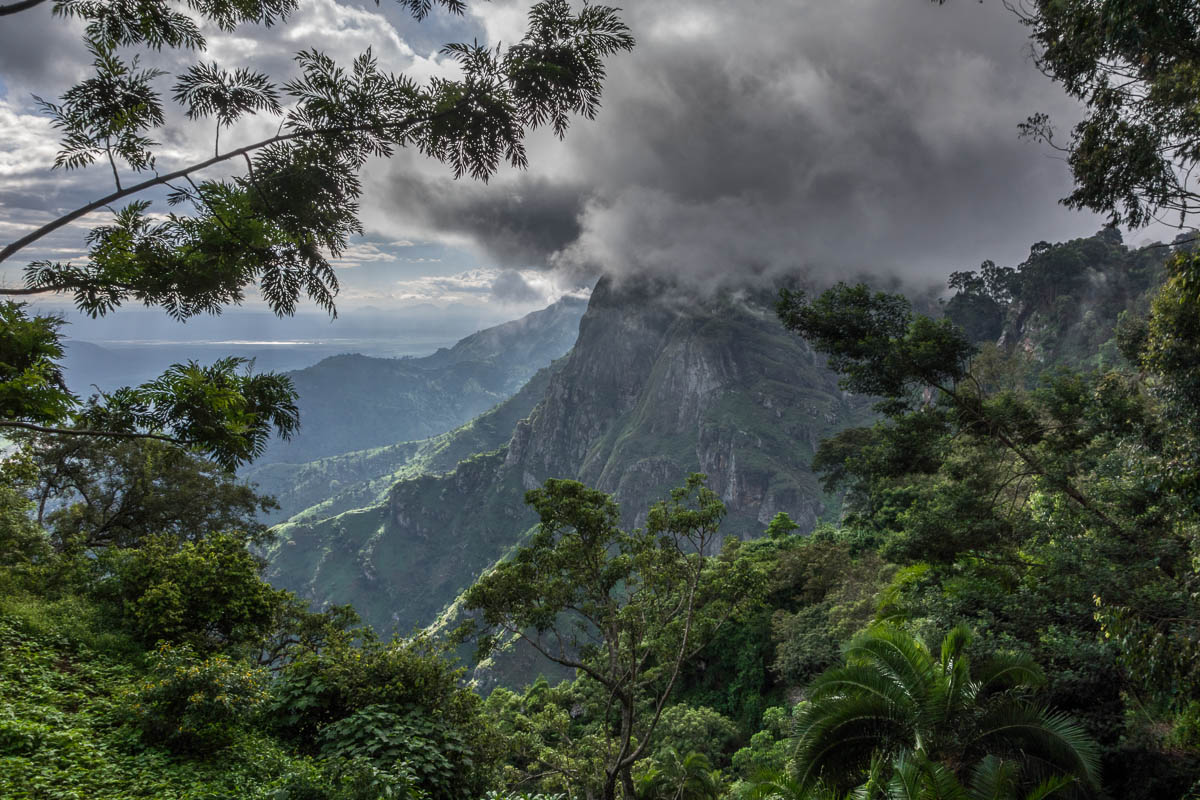
- The western Usambara Mountains

Geography
- Location: Tanga Region
- Parent range: Eastern Arc Mountains

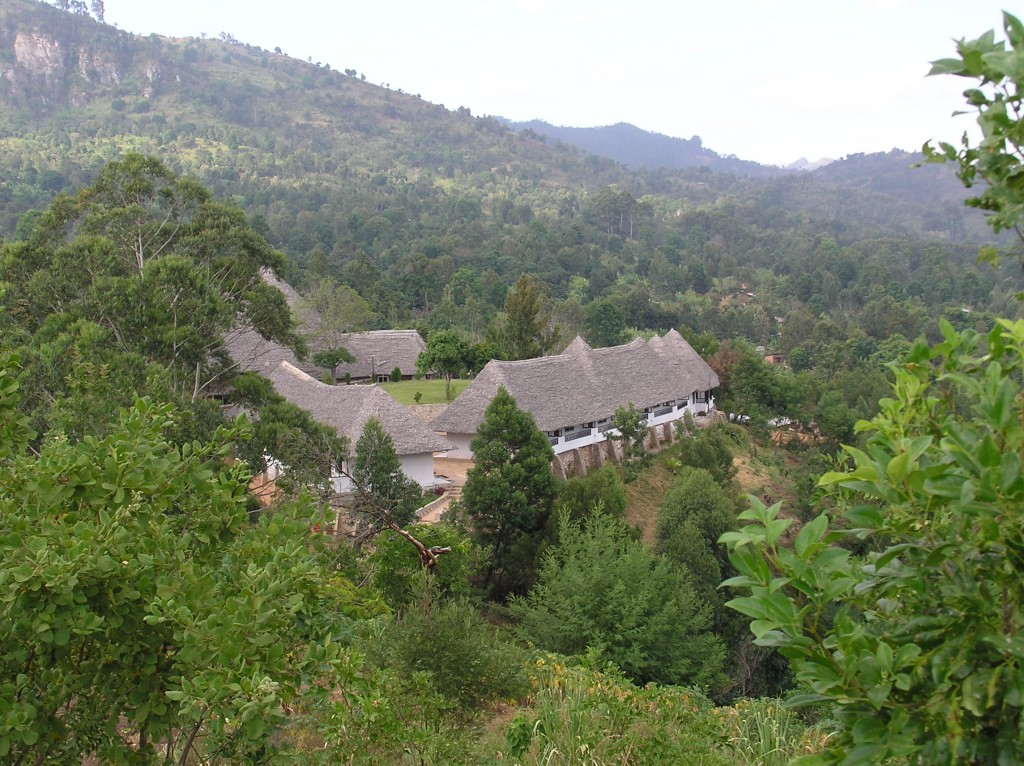
The government hotel.

The Usambara Mountains of northeastern Tanzania in tropical East Africa, comprise the easternmost ranges of the Eastern Arc Mountains. The ranges are approximately 90 kilometres (56 mi) long and about half that wide, and they are situated in the Lushoto District of the Tanga Region. They were formed nearly two million years ago by faulting and uplifting, and are composed of Precambrian metamorphic rocks. They are split into two sub-ranges; the West Usambaras being higher than the East Usambaras, which are nearer the coast and receive more rainfall.

The mountains are clad in virgin tropical rainforest which has been isolated for a long period and they are a centre of endemism. Historically they were inhabited by Bantu, Shambaa, and Maasai people but in the eighteenth century, a Shambaa kingdom was founded by Mbegha. The kingdom eventually fell apart after a succession struggle in 1862. German colonists settled in the area which was to become German East Africa, and after World War I it became part of the British mandated territory of Tanganyika.

== Geography ==
The Usambaras are approximately 90 kilometres (56 mi) long and ranging from 30–50 kilometres (19–31 mi) in width. They form part of the Eastern Arc Mountains, which stretch from Kenya through Tanzania. The range is one of the world's Biodiversity hotspots. The highest point being Chambolo peak at 2,289 meters above sea level.

The range is accessible from the towns of Lushoto in the west, and Amani in the east. The Usambaras are commonly split into two sub-ranges, the West Usambara Mountains and the East Usambara Mountains. The East Usambara are closer to the coast, receive more rainfall, and are significantly smaller than the West Usambara.

== Geology ==
The mountain range was formed nearly two million years ago. Due to a lack of glaciations and a relatively consistent climate, the rainforest has gone through a long term and unique evolution resulting in an impressive amount of endemism and an old-growth cloud rainforests.

The West and East Usambaras are large ranges of Precambrian metamorphic geologic formations of acid-gneisses, pyroxenes, and amphiboles. These mountains were formed by faulting and uplifting creating the drainage system of troughs that form many watersheds, which provide water to a majority of the population of northeast Tanzania.

== Ecology ==
The Usambara Mountains are fairly unusual in East Africa with their natural regions still covered in tropical forests, which otherwise continentally remain primarily in Western Africa. Considered tremendously significant ecologically and a Biodiversity hotspot. There are many protected zones throughout the range, which are being expanded and contributed to by the Tanzanian government, associated NGO's and research teams, and donor countries such as Norway.

Several species are endemic to the Usambara forests, including the Usambara eagle-owl (Bubo vosseleri), the Usambara akalat (Sheppardia montana), the Usambara weaver (Ploceus nicolli), the African violet (Saintpaulia ionantha), the tree species Calodendrum eickii.

== Human history ==
Historically the Usambara Mountains have been inhabited by the Bantu, Shambaa, and Maasai people who were a mix of agriculturalists and pastoralists.

A Shambaa kingdom based at Vugha was founded by Mbegha in the first half of the 18th century. His grandson Kinyashi Muanga Ike gave the kingdom a stronger political and military structure. Under Kinyashi's son Kimweri ye Nyumbai the kingdom grew to cover both the west and east Usambaras, extending down to the coast and into the Pangani River valley to the south. After Kimweri died in 1862 the kingdom fell apart in a succession struggle.

In the late 19th century when within the Usambara District of German East Africa, German colonialists came into the area bringing with them a mix of cash crops like lumber trees, coffee, tea, and quinine, and also designated forests as reserves for either water conservation or timber use. They also brought many new Western concepts, which often were diametrically opposed to traditional beliefs, such as coexistence with the forest versus forest as a "separate wilderness". The result of colonialism was a massive change in the way forests were perceived in the community, and conversion of traditional agriculture to cultivating cash crops such as quinine, pine trees, bananas, maize, tea, and coffee.

In 1882 Walter von Saint Paul-Illaire, the governor of the Usambara District of German East Africa, collected seeds of a small herb which he sent to his father, who cultivated them into plants. Hermann Wendland, the director of the Herrenhausen Gardens, formally described the plants and recognized them as representing a new species in a new genus, Saintpaulia ionantha, with the English common name African violet. Wendland's scientific name for the plant based the generic name Saintpaulia on von Saint Paul-Ilaire; the specific name he assigned means violet (Greek: ion) flower (Greek: anthos). In their native Usambara Mountains cloudforests, the plants are threatened with extinction.

Following World War I, it became part of the British mandate territory of Tanganyika. The British administration continued to reserve and exploit forests.

== Development and tourism ==
Today, the population of the Usambara Mountains region has one of the highest growth rates (about 4% compared to the Tanzanian national average of 2.1%), a staggering amount of poverty, and highest densities of people in all of Tanzania. Most of the inhabitants are subsistence farmers who rely heavily on the forests around them for timber, medicinal plants, clearing for agriculture, and fuelwood.

By 2000 nearly 70% of the original forest cover of the East Usambaras had been lost, and over 85% in the West Usambaras. The ecosystems of the Usambaras were significantly disrupted by foreign-controlled logging companies that carried out large-scale deforestation from the 1950s onwards. A sawmill at Tanga processed East Usambara timber, and its output was increased in the 1970s with Finnish development funding. Major land and forest degradation remains a pressing issue.

There are still many places that attract visitors looking for experiences beyond developed tourist resorts. These include the trade town of Lushoto with its unique Irente view point, the once-popular German resort Amani Nature Reserve and farm, and Sokoine University of Agriculture's Mazumbai Forest Reserve, which is considered the last example of pristine tropical forest in the East Usambaras. Visitors can also enjoy a trip to Shagayu Rain Forest located in Mpanga village (Mtea ward), Magamba Rain Forest, Mambo Cliffs, Caves or Mambo Footprint dated 1.5 million years ago.

== See also ==
- Amani Research Institute
- Flora of East Tropical Africa
- Millettia sacleuxii, a rare legume

== Sources ==
- "Amani Nature Reserve, Tanzania" (PDF). GEF Small Grants Programme. Equator Initiative Case Study Series. United Nations Development Programme. 2012.
- Conte, Christopher A. (2004). Highland Sanctuary: Environmental History in Tanzania's Usambara Mountains. Athens: Ohio University Press. ISBN 978-0-8214-1553-5.
- Eastwood, A.; Bytebier, B.; Tye, H.; Tye, A.; Robertson, A.; Maunder, M. (February 1998). "The conservation status of Saintpaulia". Curtis's Botanical Magazine. 15 (1): 49–62. doi:10.1111/1467-8748.00132. JSTOR 45065280.
- Feierman, Steven (1974). The Shambaa Kingdom: A History. Madison: University of Wisconsin Press. hdl:2027/heb02592.0001.001. ISBN 978-0-299-06360-3.
- Hall, Jaclyn; Burgess, Neil D.; Lovett, Jon; Mbilinyi, Boniface; Gereau, Roy E. (November 2009). "Conservation implications of deforestation across an elevational gradient in the Eastern Arc Mountains, Tanzania". Biological Conservation. 142 (11): 2510–2521. Bibcode:2009BCons.142.2510H. doi:10.1016/j.biocon.2009.05.028.
- Korschun, Rachel (2009). Square Peg, Round Hole: A Case Study of the NGO-Village Interactions of TFCG and Sagara Village, Tanzania (BA thesis). Middlebury College. hdl:10779/middlebury.21538749.v1.
- Lovett, Jon C. (2011) [first published in 1993]. "Eastern Arc moist forest flora". In Lovett, Jon C.; Wasser, Samuel K. (eds.). Biogeography and Ecology of the Rain Forests of Eastern Africa (Electronic ed.). Cambridge & New York: Cambridge University Press. pp. 33–56. doi:10.1017/CBO9780511895692.004. ISBN 978-0-511-89569-2.
- Lundgren, Lill (1980). "Comparison of surface runoff and soil loss from runoff plots in forest and small-scale agriculture in the Usambara Mts., Tanzania". Geografiska Annaler. A: Physical Geography. 62 (3–4): 113–148. Bibcode:1980GeAnA..62..113L. doi:10.1080/04353676.1980.11880005. JSTOR 520673.
- Rogers, Peter J. (2009). "History and governance in the Ngorongoro Conservation Area, Tanzania, 1959-1966". Global Environment. 2 (4): 78–117. doi:10.3197/ge.2009.020404. ISSN 2053-7352.
