= Nguru Mountains =

Mountain range in Tanzania

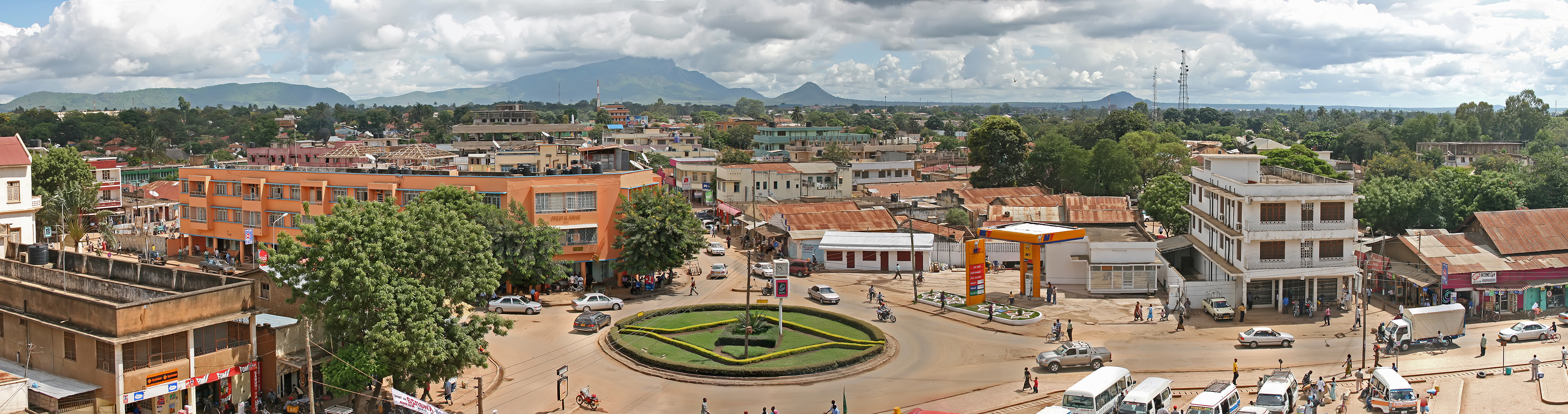
- Morogoro

Highest point
- Elevation: 2,400 m (7,900 ft)
- Coordinates: 6°00′S 37°30′E

Geography
- Location: Morogoro Region
- Parent range: Eastern Arc Mountains

The Nguru Mountains are a mountain range in Morogoro Region, Tanzania, Africa. They are part of the Eastern Arc Mountains. The mountains are predominantly covered with rainforest, home to 83 species of birds and African violets. Several forest reserves are located in the mountains.

== Geography ==
The Nguru Mountains cover an area of 1672.90 km^{2}. The highest elevation is 2400 meters in Nguru South. The range runs roughly northeast-southwest, and is split by the valley of the Mjonga River, a tributary of the Wami River. The range lies in the watershed of the Wami. The plain of the Wami and its tributary the Mkata lies to the southeast and east. The Uluguru Mountains lie to the southeast across the plain. The Ukaguru Mountains lie to the southwest, and the Nguu Mountains lie to the north; both ranges are separated from the Nguru Mountains by low hills. More hilly country separates the Maasai Steppe the northwest.

== Climate ==
The Nguru mountains intercept moisture-laden winds from the Indian Ocean, which provide most of the rainfall in the mountains. Rainfall averages 1,800 millimetres or 70 inches annually. Most of the rainfall occurs in the November-to-May wet season, although mist and light rain occur at higher elevations during the dry season. Rainfall is higher on the southern and eastern slopes, and lower in the mountains' rain shadow to the north and west. Temperatures are cooler and rainfall is higher at higher elevations.

== Geology ==
The Nguru Mountains, along with the others in the Eastern Arc, are made up of ancient crystalline Precambrian rocks that were lifted up over millions of years along fault lines. The most recent period of uplift started 30 million years ago, but the fault system and uplift process may be far older. Soils derived from these ancient rocks are not as fertile as the younger volcanic soils of mountains to the north and west.

== Flora and fauna ==
About 30 million years ago, the area was covered by extensive rainforest. During a cooler and drier period some 10 million years ago, the lowland forests were converted to savanna, leaving the mountain ranges as "islands" where the tropical forests continued to flourish. The long-term persistence of a humid climate and the isolation of each mountain range has led to a great deal of endemism, with very diverse flora and fauna. The Nguru and other Eastern Arc mountains have extremely high biodiversity with numerous endemic species (more than 25 percent of the vertebrate species).

Miombo woodland covers the Mkata-Wami plain to the east, and the low hills to the south, west, and north. Forests extend from 300 to 2000 meters elevation. The forests vary in species composition with elevation and the direction of the slope. At lower elevations on the eastern slope, evergreen lowland rainforests dominate, with flora similar to the humid Zanzibar-Inhambane coastal forests further east. At higher elevations, the mountains are home to montane rainforests, with characteristic Afromontane species. Submontane forests occur from 900 to 1400 meters elevation on the eastern slopes, and between 1400 and 1500 meters elevation on the western slopes. Montane rainforests predominate between 1400 and 2000 meters on the eastern slope, with mossy cloud forests at higher elevations. On the western slope are drier montane forests between 1600 and 200 meters. Above 2000 meters, montane heathlands predominate. An analysis of satellite images taken between 1999 and 2003 found 297 km^{2} of the mountains were still covered in evergreen forest. The Nguru and Usambara Mountains are home to the rare tree, Millettia sacleuxii, which was once feared extinct. Since its rediscovery seedlings are cultivated in some quantities.

== Protected areas and conservation ==
The mountains have one nature reserve and two forest reserves, totaling 31,409 ha. The Mkingu Nature Reserve is home to one of Tanzania's largest remaining undisturbed areas of montane forest. Mkingu was formed from the merger of the Nguru South Catchment Forest Reserve (19,793 ha) and Mkindo CFR (7,451 ha). The Kanga South CFR (6,664 ha) is in the northeastern portion of the mountains, divided from the main block by the Mjonga River valley. Magotwe reserve (709 ha) is at a lower elevation on the eastern slope, between the two mountain blocks.
