= Callulina stanleyi =

Conservation status
- Critically Endangered (IUCN 3.1)

Scientific classification
- Kingdom: Animalia
- Phylum: Chordata
- Class: Amphibia
- Order: Anura
- Family: Brevicipitidae
- Genus: Callulina
- Species: C. stanleyi

Binomial name
- Callulina stanleyi Loader, Gower, Ngalason, and Menegon, 2010

Species of amphibian

Callulina stanleyi is a species of frogs in the family Brevicipitidae. It was discovered in 2010 during a survey of rainforests in the northern part of the Eastern Arc Mountains of Tanzania. It was named in honour of the American zoologist, William T. Stanley, of the Field Museum, Chicago, who has done much research into the amphibians of Tanzania. It is present at three locations along the eastern border of Chome Forest Reserve at altitudes between 1,100 and 1,300 m (3,600 and 4,300 ft). It is rated as "critically endangered" by the International Union for Conservation of Nature.

== Description ==
Frogs in the genus Callulina are endemic to the Eastern Arc Mountains of Tanzania. They are characterised by short blunt snouts and plump bodies covered with glandular warts. Callulina stanleyi has a snout-to-vent length of 42 mm (1.7 in). The dorsal surface is mainly brown with symmetrical darker brown or black streaks. The body is covered with granulations, and the larger glandular masses are pale tan, as are the underparts. It has expanded tips to its fingers and toes, and these help to distinguish it from other similar species, Callulina dawida, Callulina laphami and Callulina shengena. It also differs from C. laphami and C. shengena by having visible tympani. It is very close morphologically to Callulina kisiwamsitu, but it can be told from that species by its call and by DNA analysis.

== Distribution and habitat ==
Callulina stanleyi is known from only three locations on the eastern edge of Chome Forest Reserve in the Eastern Arc Mountains of Tanzania at altitudes between 1,100 and 1,300 m (3,600 and 4,300 ft). Its total area of occupancy is about 9.7 km^{2} (3.7 mi^{2}). Its habitat is humid tropical submontane forest and it has also been found on roadside verges at night.

== Ecology ==
C. stanleyi is nocturnal and can be found on the ground or scrambling about in low bushes. The holotype was found during the day in a rotten log. Nothing is known about the breeding behaviour of this frog, but phylogenetic analysis has been used to predict that it exhibits direct development, with the egg mass being laid on land and hatching into juvenile frogs with no tadpole stage.

== Status ==
This frog has a very small range which is entirely within a protected area. However its three known locations adjoin the eastern boundary of the Chome Forest Reserve, and there is ongoing pressure on the reserve from the needs of the growing human population in the surrounding area. Small-scale logging still takes place in the reserve and any disturbance to its habitat is likely to be detrimental to the frog, so the International Union for Conservation of Nature has assessed the frog's conservation status as being "critically endangered".
