= Mduma's shrew =

Conservation status
- Endangered (IUCN 3.1)

Scientific classification
- Kingdom: Animalia
- Phylum: Chordata
- Class: Mammalia
- Order: Eulipotyphla
- Family: Soricidae
- Genus: Crocidura
- Species: C. mdumai

Binomial name
- Crocidura mdumai Stanley, Hutterer, Giarla, & Esselstyn, 2015

Species of mammal

Mduma's shrew (Crocidura mdumai) is a species of mammal in the family Soricidae. It is endemic to Tanzania.

== Etymology ==
It is named after Tanzanian conservationist Simon Mduma, in honor of his efforts in studying the Serengeti ecosystem.

== Distribution and habitat ==
It is restricted to Tanzania, where it is only found in the forests of the Ngorongoro Crater. Its habitat includes montane forests on the edge of the Ngorongoro caldera and drier forests on the southeastern slope.

== Description ==
The holotype had a length from head to rump of 81 mm and a tail of 59 mm. It has dark brown fur on the back and dark gray on the belly.

== Status ==
This species is considered endangered due to habitat loss from deforestation due to smallholder farming in the Ngorongoro crater.
