= Dawida =

Dawida may refer to:

- Dawida language
- Michael Dawida
- Callulina dawida, a sp. of frog
