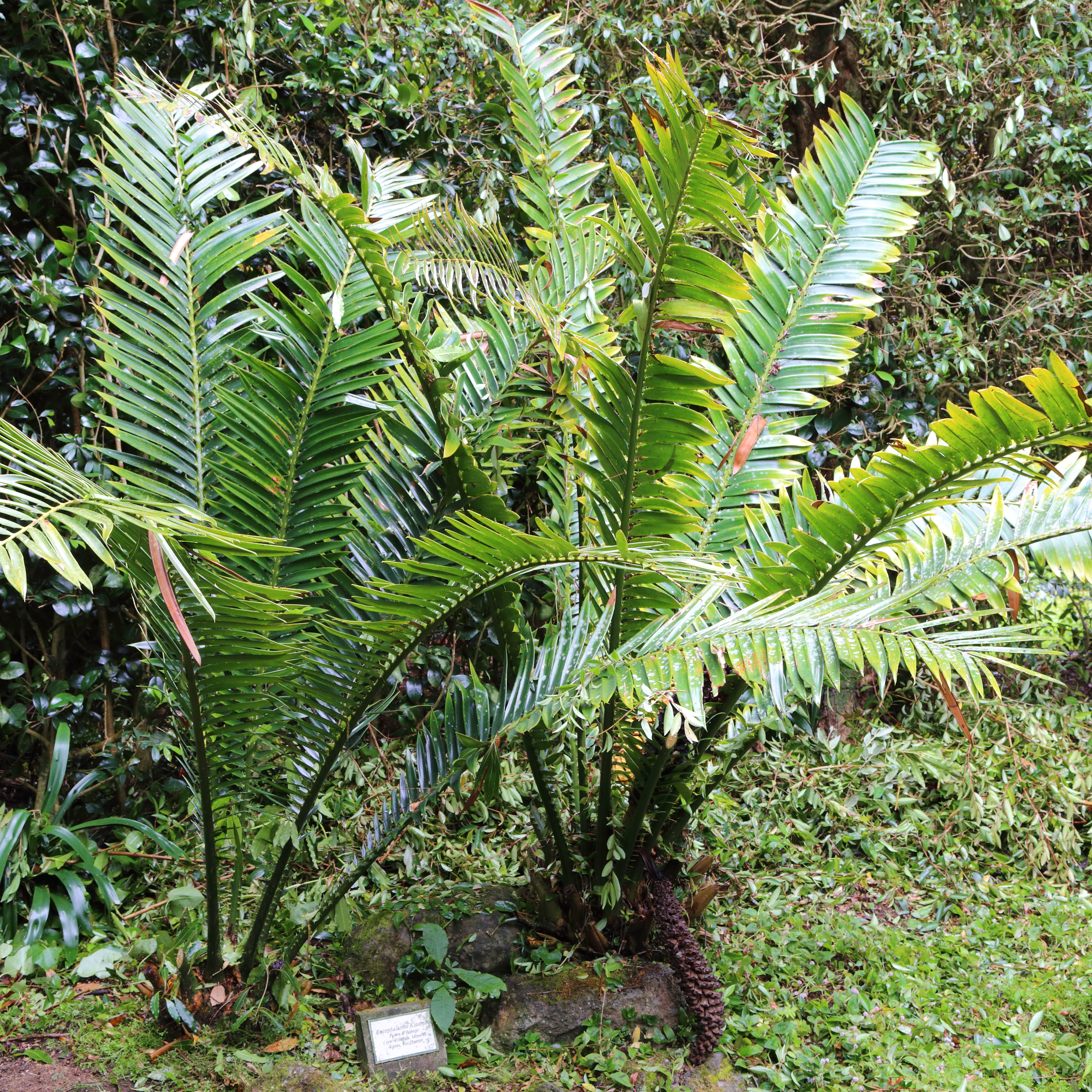

Conservation status
- Endangered (IUCN 3.1)
- CITES Appendix I

Scientific classification
- Kingdom: Plantae
- Clade: Tracheophytes
- Clade: Gymnospermae
- Division: Cycadophyta
- Class: Cycadopsida
- Order: Cycadales
- Family: Zamiaceae
- Genus: Encephalartos
- Species: E. kisambo

Binomial name
- Encephalartos kisambo Faden & Beentje

Synonyms
- Encephalartos kanga Pócs & Q.Luke; Encephalartos voiensis A.Moretti, D.W.Stev. & Sclavo

= Encephalartos kisambo =

Species of cycad

Encephalartos kisambo is a species of cycad in the family Zamiaceae native to Kenya and Tanzania. It is known as the Voi cycad. The species grows on steep, forested hills and rocky slopes, including cloud forest habitat. It is threatened by habitat loss and over-collection for the horticultural trade.

== Taxonomy ==
Encephalartos kisambo was described in 1989 by Richard Faden and H.J. Beentje. The species was discovered near Voi in 1970 by Robert Archer of the East African Herbarium in Nairobi, and was first mentioned in the literature by D. Heenan in 1977 under the provisional name Encephalartos sp. "B" ("Voi"). Haynes also noted that the epithet kisambo comes from the local Taita name for the plant. A population on Mount Kanga in the Nguru Mountains of Tanzania was later described as Encephalartos kanga by Tamás Pócs and Quentin Luke in 2007.

In a 2009 review, Jody Haynes concluded that the Mount Kanga plants should be placed in synonymy with E. kisambo. He considered the supposed distinguishing characters of E. kanga to fall within the range of variation seen in E. kisambo, and noted that the Mount Kanga plants were still unknown in the male-cone stage and that female-cone characters had been described from a single mature plant. Haynes summarised earlier taxonomic work that treated E. kisambo as closest to Encephalartos hildebrandtii, while also noting similarities to other east-central African species such as E. bubalinus, E. sclavoi, and E. tegulaneus. He further noted that later molecular work supported a close relationship between E. kisambo and geographically nearby species.

== Description ==
Encephalartos kisambo is an arborescent, dioecious cycad with a stout, barrel-shaped trunk 1.2–2 m tall and 45–52 cm in diameter, erect or sometimes decumbent. The crown bears dark green pinnate leaves 240–360 cm long with a short petiole. Young leaves are initially covered in tan hairs and later become smooth. The median leaflets are leathery, falcate to oblanceolate, slightly overlapping along the rachis, and armed with several spines near the base of the distal margin.

Male plants bear several cylindrical cones, creamy yellow at maturity, while female plants bear 1–5 ovoid to cylindrical cones that mature from pale yellow to orange or tan. The seeds are ovoid to ellipsoid and covered with an orange to orange-red fleshy outer layer.

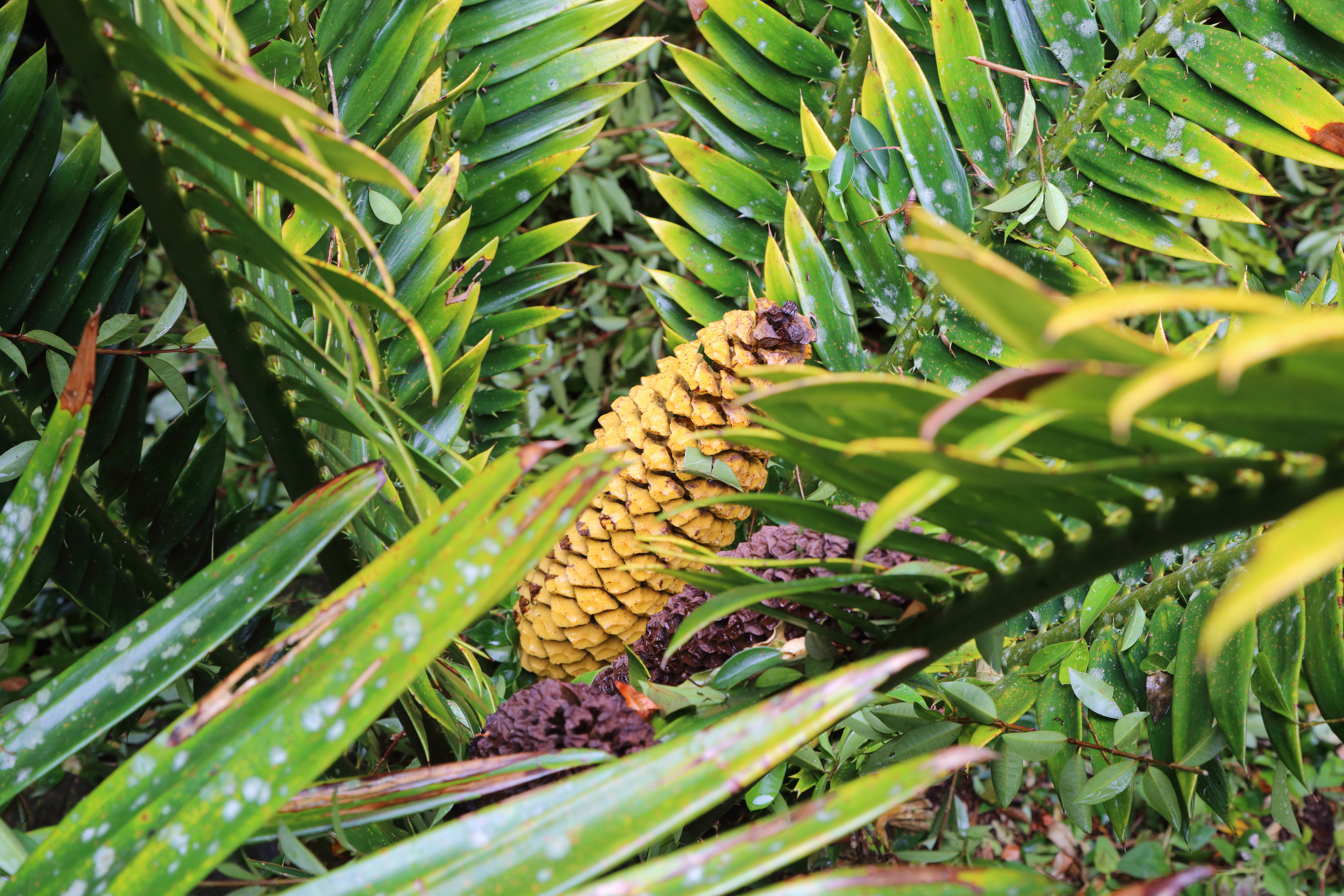
Cone

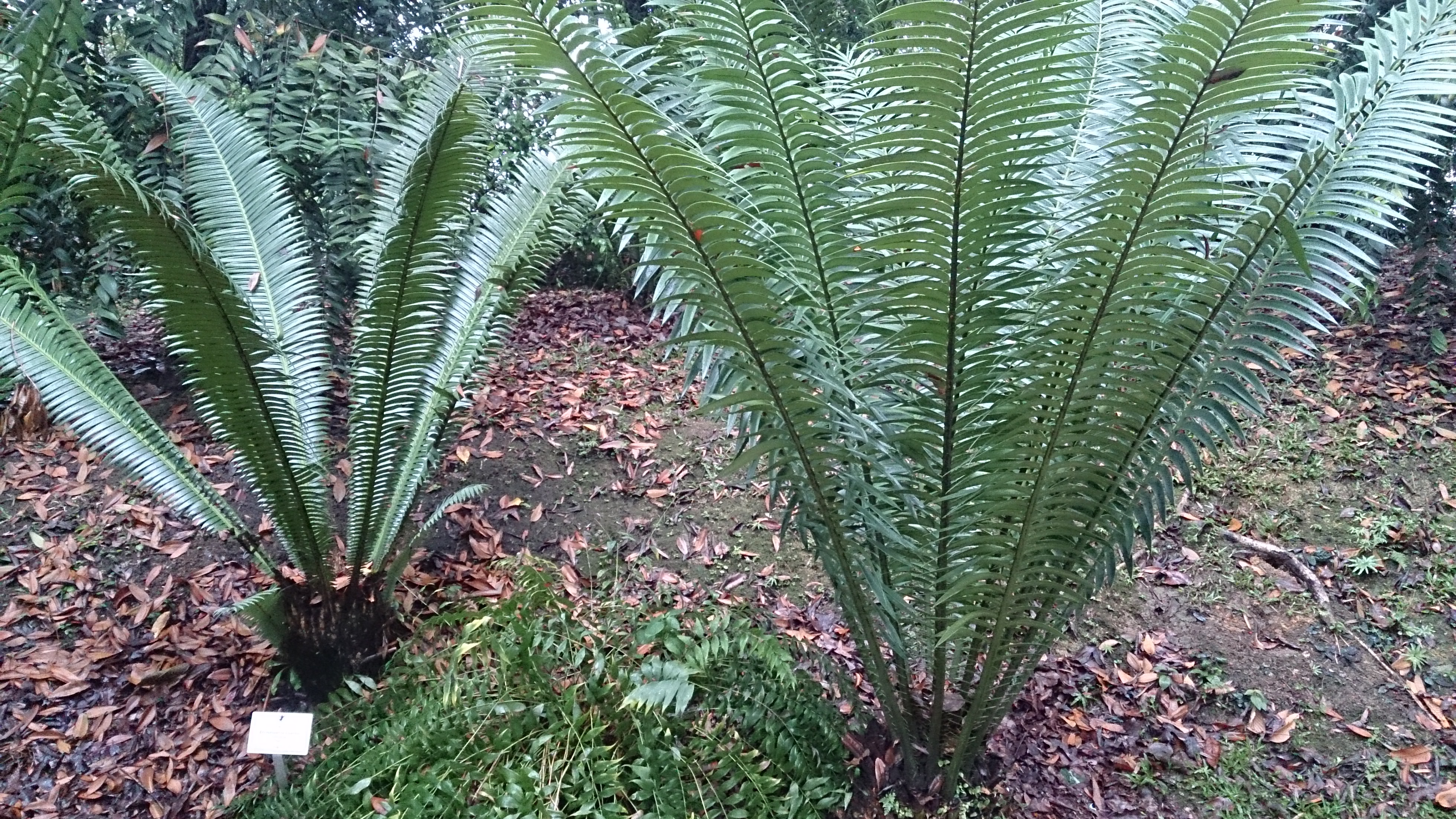
Leaves

== Distribution and habitat ==
The species is native to Kenya and Tanzania. When it was formally described, it was known with certainty only from a very small area in the Maungu Hills of Kenya. There it was reported from evergreen mist forest and, more occasionally, from exposed slopes in dry bushland at elevations of 800–1,050 m. Most populations occur on steep mountain hills near the Kenya–Tanzania border, where the plants grow in misty forest and cloud forest, with some individuals on drier rocky slopes and cliffsides.

A more southerly population occurs on Mount Kanga, a hill in the Nguru Mountains of Mvomero District, Morogoro Region, Tanzania. There the plants grow on the southern ridge and south-eastern slopes at elevations of 1,000–1,300 m, among forest and rocky heath vegetation.

== Conservation ==
Encephalartos kisambo is assessed as endangered on the IUCN Red List. Across its range it is threatened by habitat loss caused by agriculture and charcoal production, as well as by removal of plants for the horticultural trade.

The Mount Kanga population was previously assessed separately as data deficient because of uncertainty over its taxonomic status, although it was noted that, if maintained as a distinct species, it would qualify as critically endangered. That population occupies less than 10 km^{2} and has been estimated at fewer than 50 mature plants. At Mount Kanga, the mountain's sacred status and remoteness have limited deforestation, but illegal collecting for horticulture has been regarded as the principal immediate threat; some plants occur within Kanga Forest Reserve.
