= Thor's hero shrew =

Conservation status
- Data Deficient (IUCN 3.1)

Scientific classification
- Kingdom: Animalia
- Phylum: Chordata
- Class: Mammalia
- Order: Eulipotyphla
- Family: Soricidae
- Genus: Scutisorex
- Species: S. thori

Binomial name
- Scutisorex thori Stanley, Malekani & Gambalemoke in Stanley et al., 2013

Species of mammal

Thor's hero shrew (Scutisorex thori) is an extant species of shrew native to the Democratic Republic of the Congo. It and its sister species, the hero shrew (Scutisorex somereni), are the only mammal species known to have interlocking vertebrae.

== Description ==
Thor's hero shrew has a smaller skull and fewer lower vertebrae—eight instead of ten or eleven—than its sister species. The vertebrae have fewer bony offshoots, and the animal's ribs are flatter and more robust. Like the hero shrew, it has an extremely strong back—roughly four times stronger than a human's, adjusted for size. It is less than 1 foot (0.30 m) long and weighs approximately 1.7 ounces (48 g). Hero shrews are generally less flexible than most mammals, but are able to turn around in confined spaces by sagittally flexing their spines.

== Discovery ==
Thor's hero shrew was first described in Biology Letters by a team headed by vertebrate biologist William Stanley. In July 2013. It was discovered when Stanley dissected a specimen of hero shrew collected in the village of Baleko and found that its spine was different from those of known specimens. The team named the shrew after Thorvald "Thor" Holmes Jr of the Humboldt State University Vertebrate Museum, as well as referring to the Norse god Thor due to the god's association with strength.

== Evolutionary significance ==
The structure of Thor's hero shrew's cranium and vertebrae suggest that it may be descended from an evolutionary intermediate between the hero shrew and other shrews. Its existence may help explain the evolution of the hero shrew which, Stanley explains, has historically been cited as an excellent example of punctuated equilibrium, a theory that holds that species sometimes evolve very rapidly in short periods of time after long periods of stability. The existence of an intermediate species hints at a more gradual or incremental evolution for the hero shrew's extreme specialization.

Thor's hero shrew may also help explain the evolutionary advantage of interlocking vertebrae. The animal's discoverers hypothesize that both hero shrew species use their strong backs to push under logs or rocks to find worms or to crawl into the tight spaces between the trunk and the bases of palm leaves to find larvae. The proposed behavior has not been observed in the wild, but the shrews are commonly seen in palm forests, where they have runways around the tree trunks.
