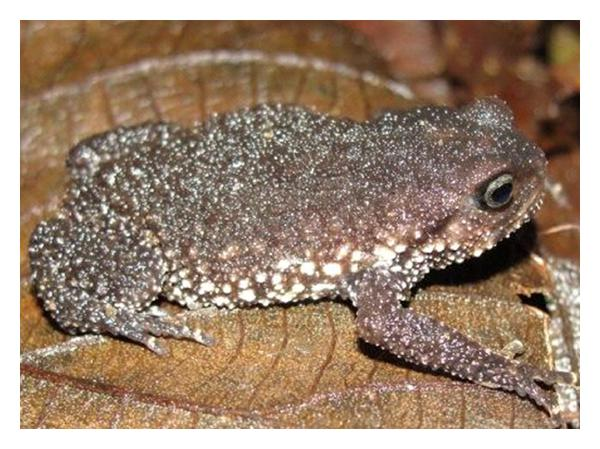
- Taita warty frog (Callulina dawida)

Scientific classification
- Domain: Eukaryota
- Kingdom: Animalia
- Phylum: Chordata
- Class: Amphibia
- Order: Anura
- Family: Brevicipitidae
- Genus: Callulina; Nieden, 1911

Type species
- Callulina kreffti Nieden, 1911 "1910"

Species
- See text.

= Callulina =

Genus of amphibians

Callulina (commonly known as the warty frogs) is a small genus of frogs in the family Brevicipitidae with nine members in Tanzania and Kenya. Originally Callulina was thought to be monotypic and widely distributed through Eastern Arc Mountains in Tanzania and in southern Kenya. However, within the last decade eight new species has been identified, the majority of which are considered critically endangered by the International Union for Conservation of Nature (IUCN).

== Species ==
Amphibian Species of the World lists nine Callulina species, most of which have been discovered within the last decade.

- Callulina dawida, Taita warty frog Loader, Measey, de Sá, & Malonza, 2009
- Callulina hanseni, Hansen's warty frog Loader, Gower, Müller, & Menegon, 2010
- Callulina kanga, Krefft's secret frog Loader, Gower, Müller, & Menegon, 2010
- Callulina kisiwamsitu, Mazumbai warty frog de Sá, Loader, & Channing, 2004
- Callulina kreffti, Krefft's warty frog Nieden, 1911
- Callulina laphami, Lapham's warty frog Loader, Gower, Ngalason, & Menegon, 2010
- Callulina meteora, Nguru warty frog Menegon, Gower, and Loader, 2011.
- Callulina shengena, Shengena warty frog Loader, Gower, Ngalason, & Menegon, 2010
- Callulina stanleyi, Stanley's warty frog Loader, Gower, Ngalason, & Menegon, 2010
