= Callulina meteora =

Conservation status
- Critically Endangered (IUCN 3.1)

Scientific classification
- Kingdom: Animalia
- Phylum: Chordata
- Class: Amphibia
- Order: Anura
- Family: Brevicipitidae
- Genus: Callulina
- Species: C. meteora

Binomial name
- Callulina meteora Menegon, Gower, and Loader, 2011

Species of frog

Meteora Secret Frog (Callulina meteora) in Tanzania

Callulina meteora, the Nguru warty frog, is a species of frog in the family Brevicipitidae, endemic to Tanzania. It lives in the Nguru South Forest Reserve between 1980 and 2100 meters above sea level.

This frog has brightly colored glands and a metallic sheen to its skin.
