= Callulina kanga =

Conservation status
- Critically Endangered (IUCN 3.1)

Scientific classification
- Kingdom: Animalia
- Phylum: Chordata
- Class: Amphibia
- Order: Anura
- Family: Brevicipitidae
- Genus: Callulina
- Species: C. kanga

Binomial name
- Callulina kanga Loader, Gower, Müller, and Menegon, 2010

Species of amphibian

Callulina kanga, the Kanga warty frog, is a frog in the family Brevicipitidae endemic to Tanzania. It has been observed in the Kanga Forest Reserve, 760 meters above sea level.
