= Fritz Nieden =

German zoologist

Fritz Nieden (1883–1942) was a German zoologist who specialized in African herpetology.

He worked as a zoologist at the Museum für Naturkunde in Berlin. His name is associated with Nieden's dwarf skink, Panaspis megalurus. In 1911 he was the first to describe Callulina kreffti, a species of frog, which until 2004 was the only known species of the genus Callulina.

The Sagala caecilian, Boulengerula niedeni, is named after him.

== Selected writings ==
- Die Amphibienfauna von Kamerun (1908), Mitteilungen aus dem Zoologischen Museum in Berlin 3: 491–518 ("Amphibian fauna of Cameroon")
- Die Reptilien (außer den Schlangen) und Amphibien, 1910 - Reptiles (other than snakes) and amphibians.
- Gymnophoina (Amphibia apoda), 1913 - Gymnophiona (caecilians).
- Amphibia : Anura I subordo Aglossa und Phanerglossa, sectio 1 Arcifera, 1923 - Anura I, suborders Aglossa and Phaneroglossa.
- Amphibia. Anura II. Engystomatidae ... Mit 55 Abbildungen, 1926 - Anura II, Engystomatidae.
