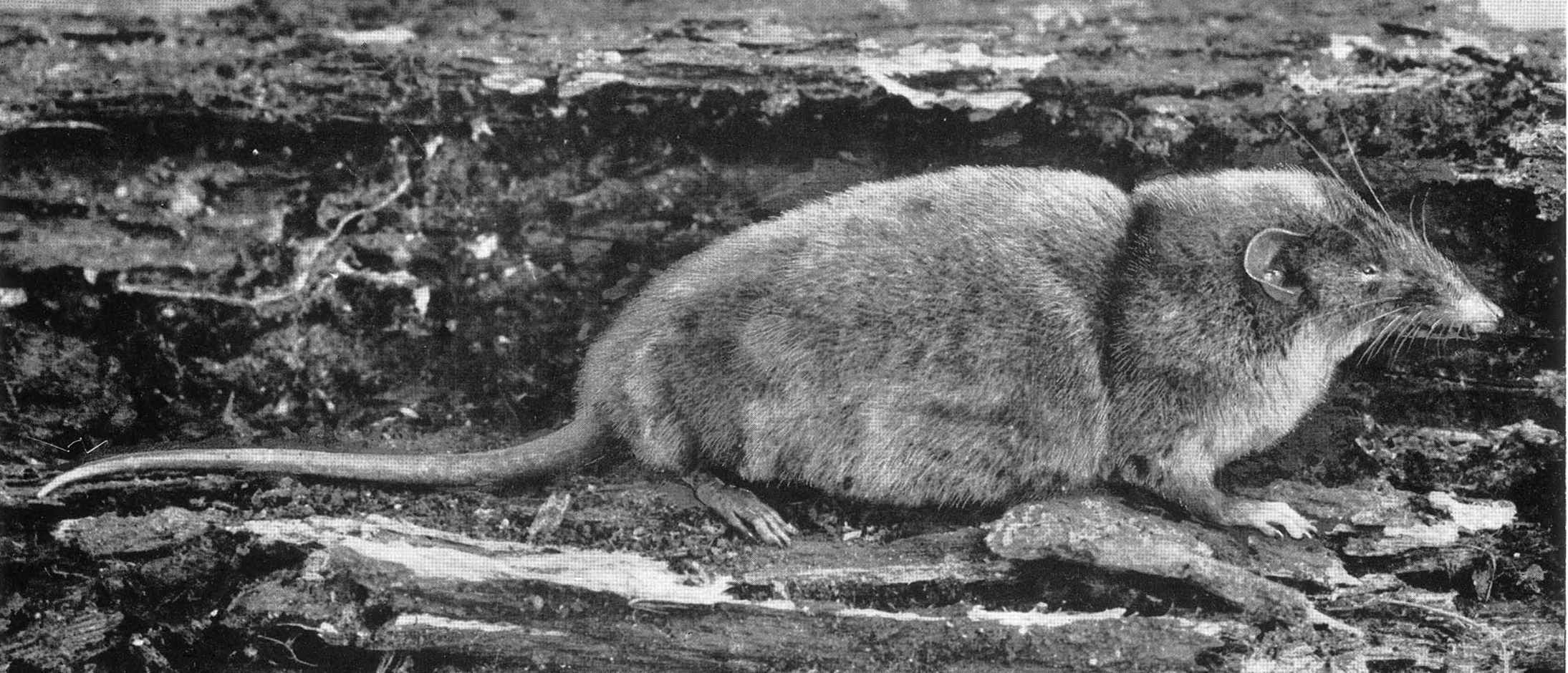

Conservation status
- Least Concern (IUCN 3.1)

Scientific classification
- Kingdom: Animalia
- Phylum: Chordata
- Class: Mammalia
- Order: Eulipotyphla
- Family: Soricidae
- Genus: Scutisorex
- Species: S. somereni

Binomial name
- Scutisorex somereni (Thomas, 1910)
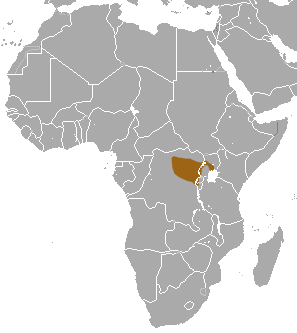
- Armored shrew range

= Hero shrew =

Species of shrew

The hero shrew (Scutisorex somereni), also known as the armored shrew, is a large shrew native to the Congo Basin of Africa. Its features are typical of a white-toothed shrew − short legs, slender snout, dense fur − except for a highly unusual spinal column. It has corrugated interlocking vertebrae that are unique among mammals except for its sister species, Thor's hero shrew. This unique adaptation allows the animal to bear a huge amount of weight on its back − 72 kg (159 lb) according to an expedition team.

The hero shrew lives in both lowland and mountain forests. They live in the undergrowth, feeding primarily on invertebrates. The evolutionary benefit of its unusual spine is unknown; it is hypothesized that it allows the animal to push itself under logs or between a palm tree's leaves and trunk to find food. Local tribes of people believe the hero shrew holds magical powers. It is classified as Least Concern by IUCN.

== Description ==
Externally, the hero shrew resembles a typical large shrew. It has short legs, a slender snout, and small eyes. It has dense, coarse fur that is gray in color. It has two types of fur; some hair strands provide sensory functions while other produce scent. The hero shrew aggressively marks its territory, contorting its body to mark objects with its scent. It is thought that the odor repels other members of its species. The chemical it emits can discolor its fur yellow.

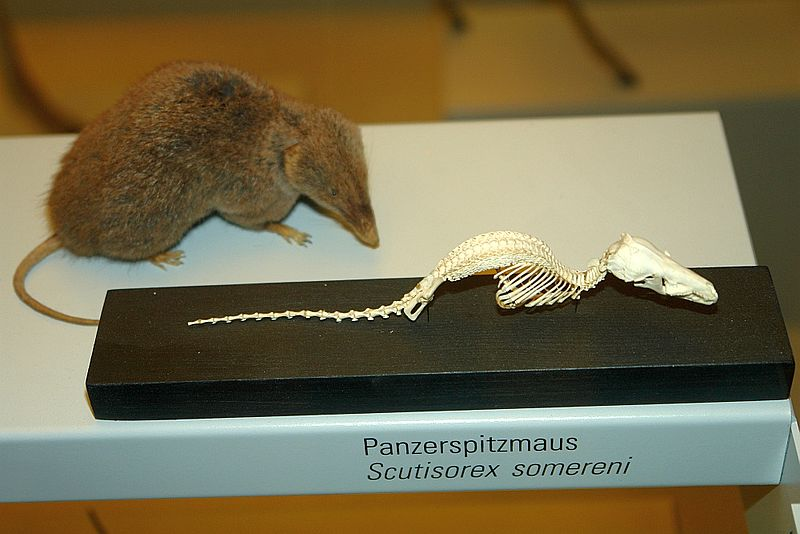
Specimen and partial skeleton showing enlarged backbone at the University of Zurich Zoological Museum

The hero shrew lives in the forest undergrowth in sparsely populated areas, which leads to it rarely being seen by humans. It is primarily an insectivore, but will eat small amphibians and lizards in the wild, and bird and mammal meat in captivity. A fully grown hero shrew's body is 12–15 centimetres (4.7–5.9 in) in length with a tail of 6.8–9.5 centimetres (2.7–3.7 in). It weighs 70–113 grams (2.5–4.0 oz). It does not exhibit sexual dimorphism. The breeding habits of the hero shrew have not been observed.

=== Adaptations ===
The vertebrae of the hero shrew are thick, corrugated cylinders. The vertebrae interlock on their sides and lower surfaces. The animal's spine has bony projections that mesh to form a strong yet flexible backbone. The differences are especially pronounced in the lower back between the rib cage and hips. The hero shrew has 11 lumbar vertebrae, in contrast to a typical mammal which has 5 such vertebrae. The spine of the hero shrew accounts for 4% of its body weight, in contrast to 0.5–1.6% for a typical small mammal. The ribs of the shrew are thicker than those of similarly sized mammals and the spinal muscles are significantly different. Its abdominal muscles are reduced, while its spinal muscles are enlarged. As a result, the hero shrew has a peculiar gait with its spine flexing in a snake-like manner.

During an expedition to the Congo region in the 1910s, the natives demonstrated the remarkable strength of the hero shrew to naturalists Herbert Lang and James Chapin. After some mystical preparation, an adult male estimated to weigh 72 kg (159 lb) stepped on a shrew and balanced himself on one foot. After several minutes, the man stepped off and the shrew left unharmed. The combination of animal's vertebral strength and its convex curvature behind the shoulder kept its vital organs from being crushed in the demonstration. The feat represented a weight of roughly 1000 times the animal's body weight, the equivalent of a human holding 10 elephants. Relative to body size, the hero shrew's spine is roughly four times more robust than any other vertebrate (excluding its sister species).

Despite its great strength, the hero shrew's spine is easily flexed sagittally (the muscles for doing this are well developed). As a result, the animal can turn 180° within a burrow only slightly wider than the shrew. However, the animal cannot extend its spine or bend it laterally. Its intervertebral joints are five times more resistant to twisting along the axis than a common rat, adjusted for size.

=== Range and status ===
The hero shrew is found in tropical rainforest in the Congo Basin and nearby mountains, over an altitudinal range of 700 to 2,230 m (2,300 to 7,320 ft). It appears to be dependent on forest habitat. In the mountains it is often present near streams. Its range includes Burundi, the Democratic Republic of the Congo, Rwanda, and Uganda, but apparently does not extend west of the Oubangi River.

The hero shrew is listed as a Least Concern species by the International Union for Conservation of Nature (IUCN). It is thought to have a large population and relatively wide distribution. Its distribution overlaps multiple protected areas and thus the hero shrew is unlikely to experience significant population decline in the near future.

== Adaptive significance ==
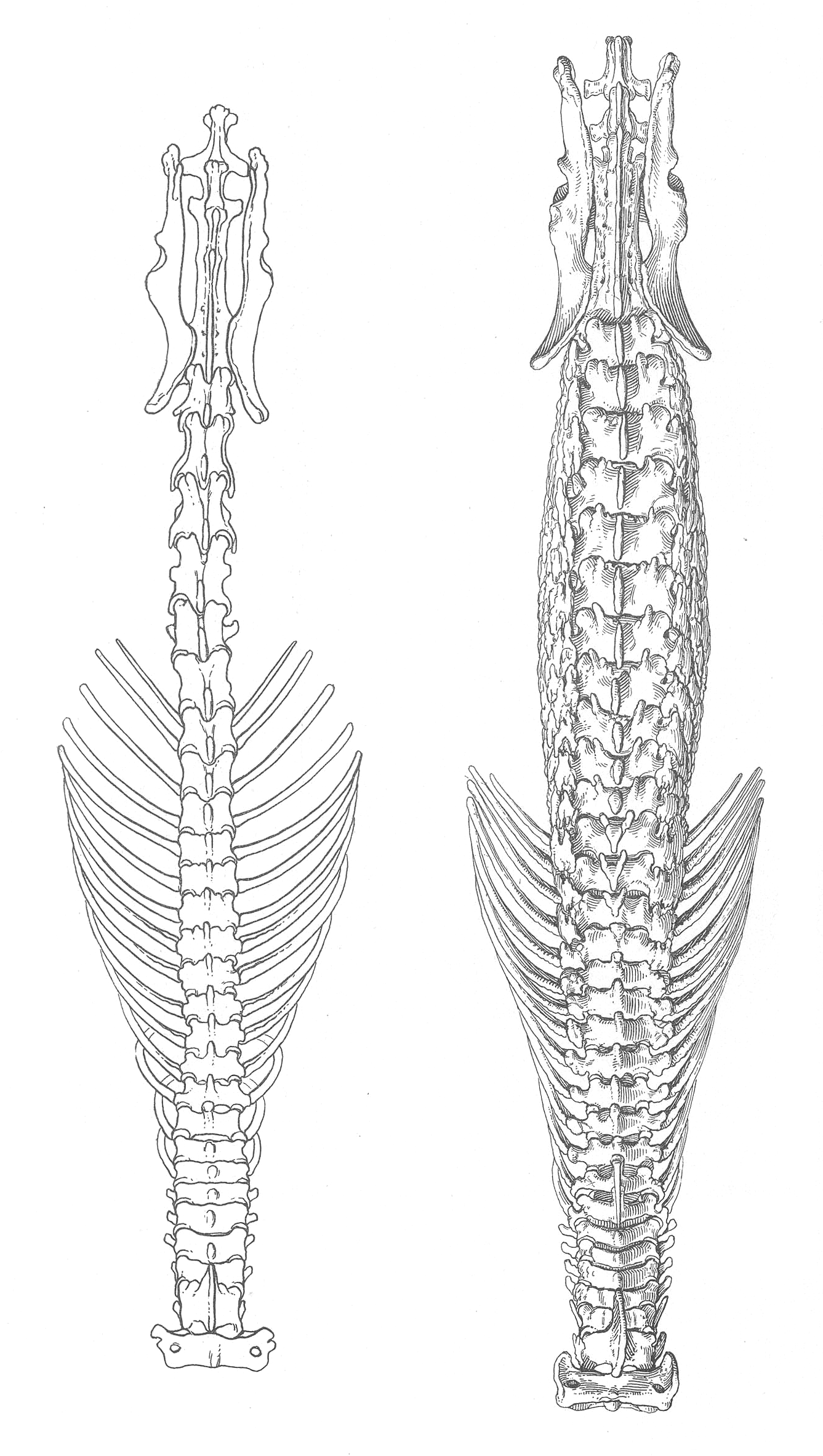
The spine and rib cage of the hero shrew (right) compared to a typical white-toothed shrew

Typically, the backbone is thought to be one of the most conserved parts of the skeleton. Why the hero shrew did not follow this pattern has presented a significant puzzle. Prior to 2013, there was no satisfactory explanation for adaptive advantage of the strong spine. In 1974, Jonathan Kingdon suggested that the robust spine and associated posture keeps the animal's body clear of wet ground in swampy habitats. An alternate idea was that the intricate spine somehow evolved as the consequence of some unrelated adaptive factor, as in the spandrels of St. Marco hypothesis. Neither idea had strong scientific support. In 1998, Dennis Cullinane and his colleagues undertook an extensive survey of hero shrew's anatomy and concluded there was no obvious functional significance for the adaptation.

In 2013, a team headed by William T. Stanley of the Field Museum proposed that Scutisorex may use their exceptional spines to lever logs or dead palm leaves, enabling access to invertebrate prey such as earthworms. Although this behavior has not been directly observed, when local people are collecting beetle larvae in a similar fashion, they often encounter the shrews. Scientist Kristofer Helgen called the new theory "the first compelling explanation for the adaptive significance of the unusual spine."

== Initial scientific description ==
The hero shrew was first described in 1910 by Oldfield Thomas from a single specimen found in Uganda. But its unique spinal structure was not discovered until 1917, when J. A. Allen examined a preserved specimen from the American Museum of Natural History. The name "hero shrew" stems from the local Mangbetu name for the animal.

== Cultural significance ==
The hero shrew is revered in its homeland. Its extraordinary strength has led to the shrew being used as a talisman by the local Mangbetu people. Tradition holds that any part of the shrew, even its ashes, will provide invincibility in battle. Local medicine men use the shrew to create a medicine said to provide courage and protection from injury during battle.
