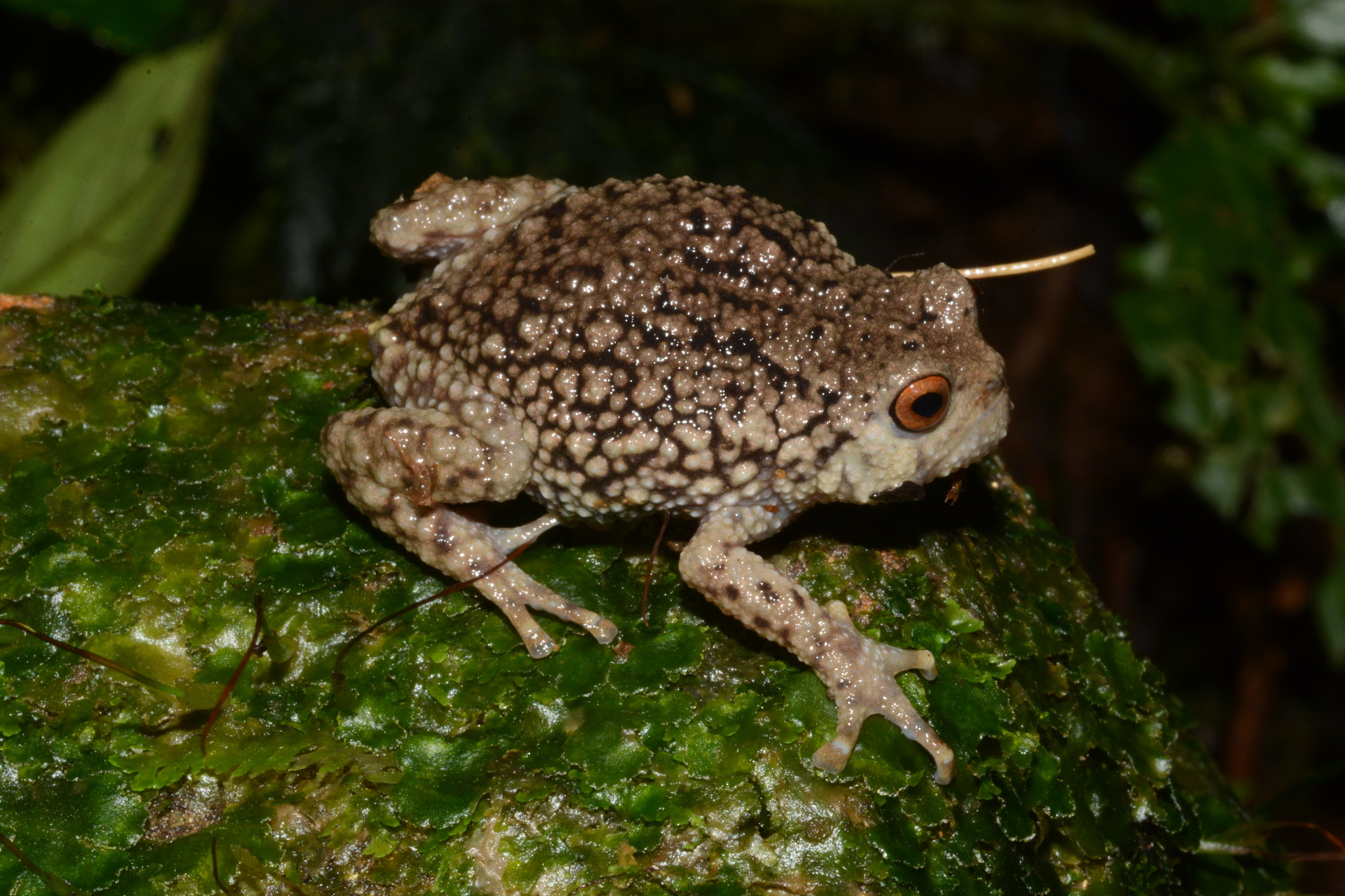

Conservation status
- Critically Endangered (IUCN 3.1)

Scientific classification
- Kingdom: Animalia
- Phylum: Chordata
- Class: Amphibia
- Order: Anura
- Family: Brevicipitidae
- Genus: Callulina
- Species: C. hanseni

Binomial name
- Callulina hanseni Loader, Gower, Müller, and Menegon, 2010

= Callulina hanseni =

Species of frog

Callulina hanseni, or Hansen's warty frog, is a critically endangered species of frog in the family Brevicipitidae endemic to Tanzania. It has been observed in the Nguru South Mountains. It has been observed 1790 meters above sea level.
