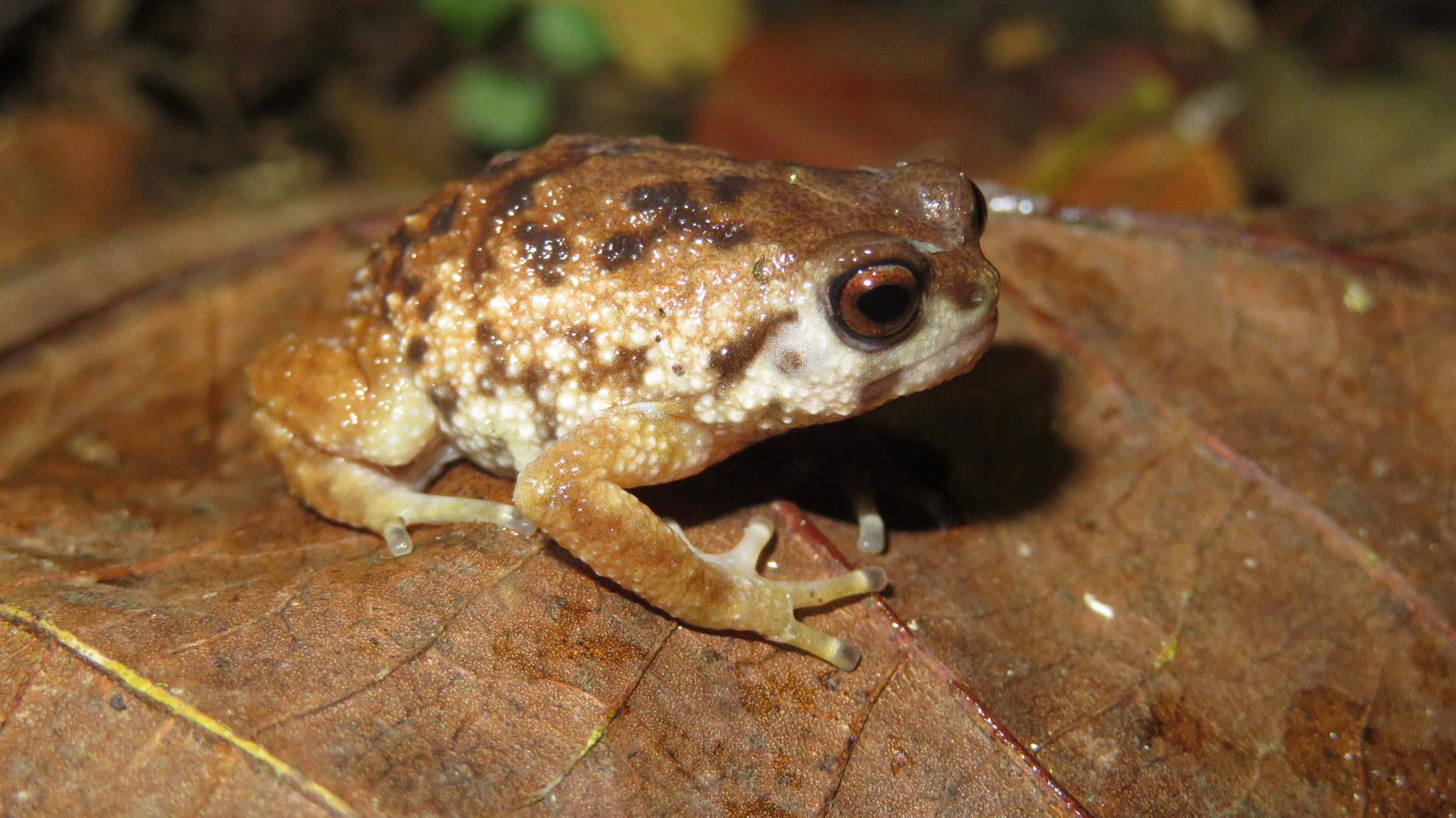

Conservation status
- Endangered (IUCN 3.1)

Scientific classification
- Kingdom: Animalia
- Phylum: Chordata
- Class: Amphibia
- Order: Anura
- Family: Brevicipitidae
- Genus: Callulina
- Species: C. kisiwamsitu

Binomial name
- Callulina kisiwamsitu de Sá, Loader, and Channing, 2004

= Mazumbai warty frog =

Species of amphibian

The Mazumbai warty frog (Callulina kisiwamsitu) is a species of frogs in the family Brevicipitidae. It is endemic to forests of the West Usambara Mountains of Tanzania where it is threatened by habitat loss. It is part of a species complex and was recognised as a separate species in 2004, having previously been included in Callulina kreffti.

== Description ==
Callulina kisiwamsitu is a small species with an adult length of 30 to 40 millimetres (1.2 to 1.6 in). The females are larger than males. The skin is densely warted and the colour is a mottling of various shades of brown and black.

== Distribution and habitat ==
Callulina kisiwamsitu is endemic to the West Usambara Mountains in Tanzania. Much of this area has been deforested and this species is found in the remains of the forested area around Lushoto including the Mazumbai Forest Reserve, Ambangula Forest Reserve and Shume-Mugambo Forest Reserve. It is found climbing trees and on the ground in damp forests with thick undergrowth.

== Biology ==
Callulina kisiwamsitu is a predator and feeds on small invertebrates including bugs, grasshoppers and millipedes.

Breeding takes place in the rainy season. The male Callulina kisiwamsitu calls from low vegetation to attract a mate. The eggs are laid on land under cover in damp places. It is believed that direct development of the young takes place with juvenile frogs hatching directly from the eggs.

== Status ==
The IUCN Red List of Threatened Species regards this species as "endangered" as its range is small (believed to be about 217 km^{2} (84 sq mi)) and it only occurs in one location where its habitat is being lost. Its population trend is unknown. It is not known whether its habitat is severely fragmented.
