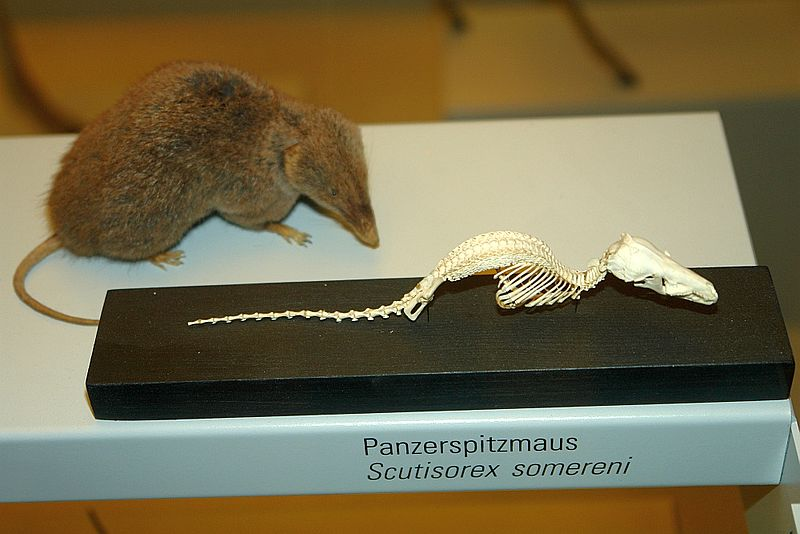
- Hero shrew specimen and partial skeleton at the University of Zurich Zoological Museum

Scientific classification
- Kingdom: Animalia
- Phylum: Chordata
- Class: Mammalia
- Order: Eulipotyphla
- Family: Soricidae
- Subfamily: Crocidurinae
- Genus: Scutisorex; Thomas, 1913

Type species
- Sylvisorex somereni (Thomas, 1910)

Species
- See text

= Scutisorex =

Genus of mammals

Scutisorex is a genus of African shrews, mammals of the family Soricidae. Members of the genus are the only known mammal species whose vertebrae interlock, a feature which, along with the general enlargement and strengthening of the backbone and ribs, allows them to bear remarkable loads. They also have well-developed muscles for flexing their spine in the sagittal plane. It is thought that these adaptations allow the shrews to wedge open spaces between the trunks of palm trees and the stems of dead leaves, as well underneath logs and rocks, allowing them to partake of a reliable source of insect larvae and earthworms that would otherwise be inaccessible.

The genus contains the following species:

- Hero shrew (Scutisorex somereni) - (Thomas, 1910)
- Thor's hero shrew (Scutisorex thori) - Stanley, Malekani & Gambalemoke in Stanley et al., 2013

Analysis of DNA sequences of several genes (mitochondrial cytochrome b and nuclear von Willebrand factor) suggests that the two species of Scutisorex split about 4 Ma ago, and that Scutisorex diverged from other crocidurine shrews about 14 Ma ago.
