= Callulina shengena =

Conservation status
- Critically Endangered (IUCN 3.1)

Scientific classification
- Kingdom: Animalia
- Phylum: Chordata
- Class: Amphibia
- Order: Anura
- Family: Brevicipitidae
- Genus: Callulina
- Species: C. shengena

Binomial name
- Callulina shengena Loader, Gower, Ngalason, and Menegon, 2010

Species of amphibian

Callulina shengena is a species of frogs in the family Brevicipitidae. It was discovered in 2010 during a survey of rainforests in the northern part of the Eastern Arc Mountains of Tanzania. It is present at two locations in Chome Forest Reserve at altitudes between 1,920 and 2,100 m (6,300 and 6,900 ft). The forests in which it lives are being selectively felled, and the International Union for Conservation of Nature has rated its conservation status as "critically endangered".

== Description ==
Frogs in the genus Callulina are endemic to the Eastern Arc Mountains of Tanzania. They are characterised by short blunt snouts and plump bodies covered with glandular warts. Callulina shengena is mainly grey with small white tubercles. It is a relatively large species of Callulina, reaching 43 mm (1.7 in) in snout–urostyle length.

== Distribution and habitat ==
Callulina shengena is known from only two small locations in the Chome Forest Reserve in the Eastern Arc Mountains of Tanzania. Its typical habitat is humid tropical montane forest, particularly forest dominated by the East African camphorwood (Ocotaea usambarensis). Its total area of occupancy is estimated to be 35 km^{2} (13.5 mi^{2}) but this assumes that the frog is also present in the area intervening between its known locations.

== Ecology ==
Very little is known of the ecology of this species, specimens having been caught in pitfall traps, but some individuals have been seen climbing on undergrowth, low branches and tree trunks at night, at heights up to about 2.2 m (7.2 ft). It is believed that all members of the family Brevicipitidae reproduce on the ground by direct development.

== Status ==
The Chome Forest Reserve is being degraded by timber harvesting activities, with the valuable East African camphorwood being felled. C. shengena has never been found in the secondary forest that grows in place of the virgin forest. The ongoing destruction of its habitat does not augur well for this frog with its small range, and the International Union for Conservation of Nature has rated it as "critically endangered".
