= Lake Magadi (Ngorongoro) =

Lake in Tanzania

Coordinates: 3°11′21″S 35°32′16″E

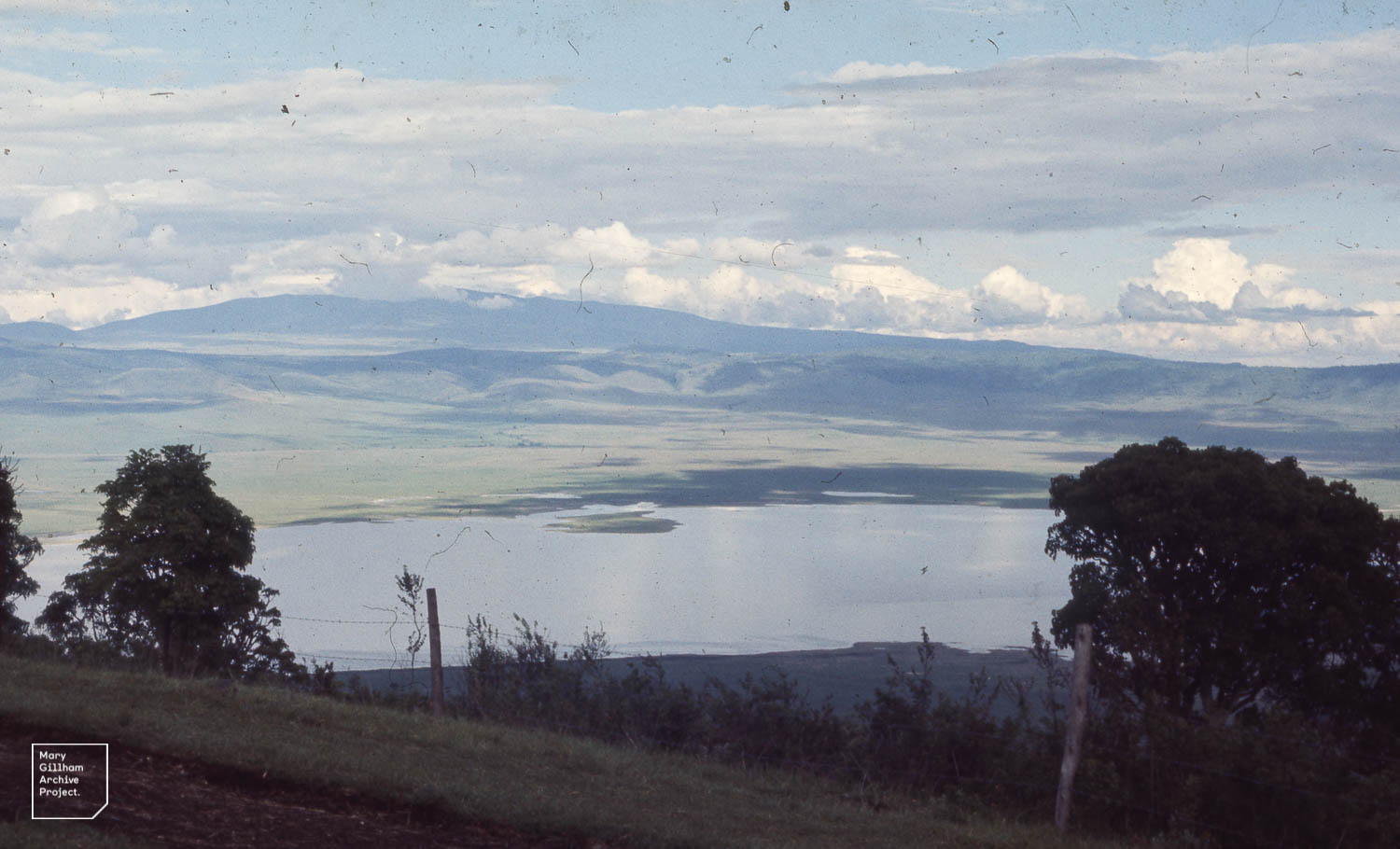

- Location within Tanzania
- Location: Arusha Region, Tanzania
- Primary inflows: Munge River, Seneto springs
- Basin countries: Tanzania
- Surface elevation: 1,730 m (5,680 ft)
- Islands: Mti Moja (temporarily)

Lake Magadi (Note: Also spelled Magad, Makat, or Makati) is a shallow soda lake in the southwest of the Ngorogoro crater in northeastern Tanzania. It is fed by the Munge River and the Seneto springs. It is often inhabited by thousands of mainly lesser flamingoes. The lake's name comes from the word for salty in the Maasai language. It is 1730 metres above sea level.

== Description ==
Lake Magadi is a shallow soda lake inside Ngorongoro Crater, a large 22 by 18 km (14 by 11 mi) caldera in northern Tanzania. It sits in the southwest portion of the caldera's floor. Lerai Forest and Gorigor Swamp lie to its south, and Mandusi Swamp lies to its north.

Lake Magadi's water level varies widely, expanding to an area of 18 km^{2} (6.9 mi^{2}) in 1964 and completely drying in years with low rainfall. Very high lake levels, such as in 1998, can turn the Mti Moja peninsula into an island. It is fed year-round by the Munge River, which enters Ngorongoro Crater from the northeast. The river originates from springs in Olmoti Crater. The lake is also fed by the Seneto springs. The lake is linked to Gorigor Swamp to its southeast by two drainage channels.
