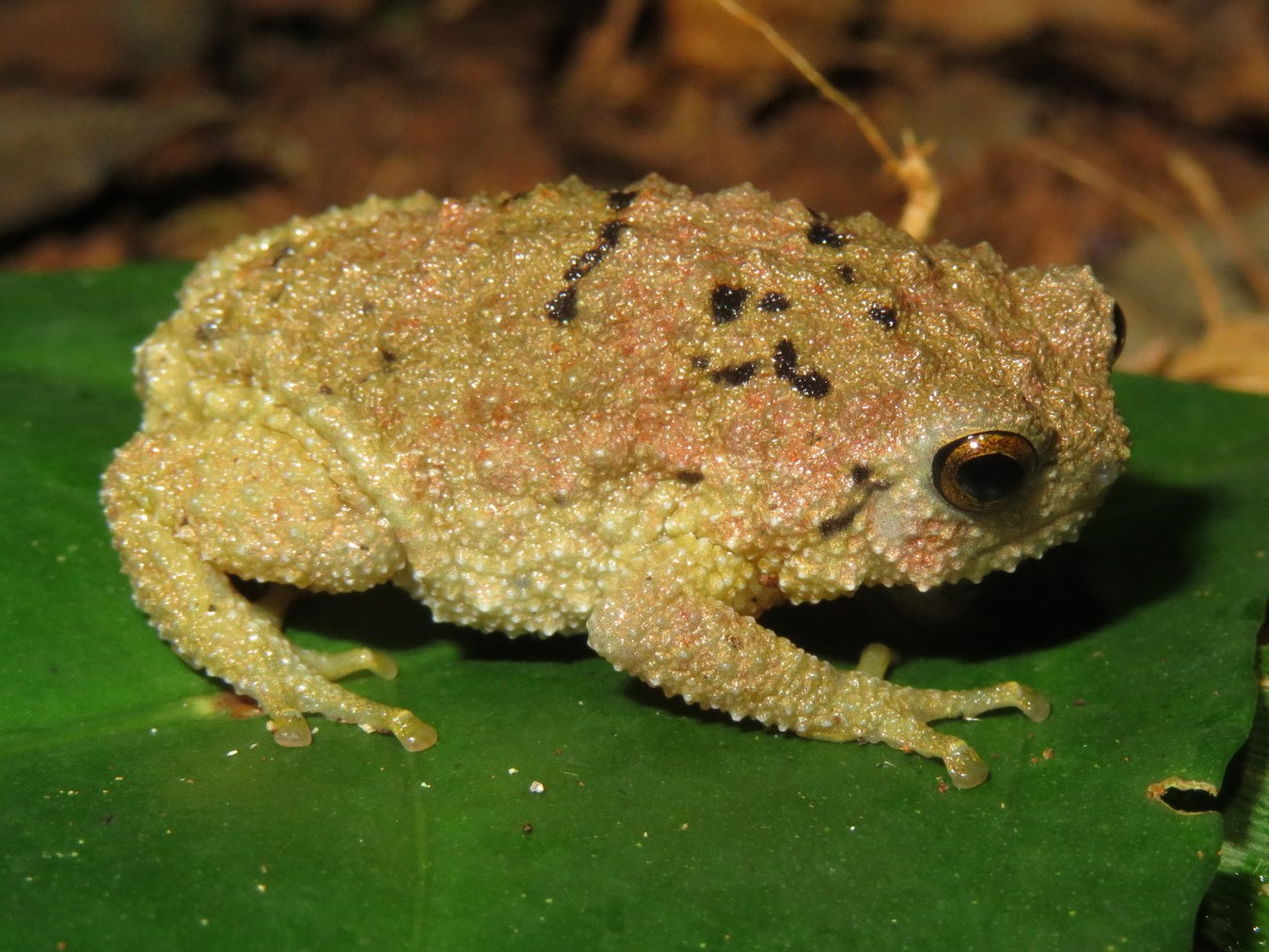

Conservation status
- Least Concern (IUCN 3.1)

Scientific classification
- Kingdom: Animalia
- Phylum: Chordata
- Class: Amphibia
- Order: Anura
- Family: Brevicipitidae
- Genus: Callulina
- Species: C. kreffti

Binomial name
- Callulina kreffti Nieden, 1911

= Krefft's warty frog =

Species of amphibian

Krefft's warty frog (Callulina kreffti), or Krefft's secret frog, is a species of frog in the family Brevicipitidae. It is found in the Eastern Arc Mountains in Tanzania and in southern Kenya. Its natural habitats are subtropical or tropical moist lowland forests, subtropical or tropical moist montane forests, rural gardens, and heavily degraded former forest. It is threatened by habitat loss.

== Description ==
Krefft's warty frog is a sturdy frog with a short snout, visible tympani behind the eyes and short legs. It can grow to a length of 41 millimetres (1.6 in). The fingers and toes are short with wide toe pads. The dorsal surface is glandular and densely covered with small warts and the general colour is greyish-brown, rusty brown or greyish black. The underside is paler. This species could be confused with Breviceps mossambicus but that species lacks the large, square-ended toe pads which help Callulina kreffti to clamber about in trees.

== Distribution and habitat ==
Krefft's warty frog is endemic to both lowland and upland regions of southern Kenya and northern and eastern Tanzania. In Kenya it is restricted to the Taita Hills and Shimba Hills while in Tanzania it is found in the Pare Mountains, the Usambara Mountains, the Uluguru Mountains, the Nguru Mountains, the Ukaguru Mountains and the Udzungwa Mountains. It occurs at heights ranging from 300 to 2,200 metres (980 to 7,220 ft) above sea level. It lives among leaf litter in forests, hiding under rocks and fallen logs or scrambling about in low vegetation, but can also be found in cleared areas near the edge of forests. It is sometimes found in the leaf axils of banana plants.

== Status ==
Krefft's warty frog seems to be more resilient to habitat degradation than some other species of frog and is listed as being of "Least Concern" in the IUCN Red List of Threatened Species. The main threat it faces is from the ongoing clearing of its forest home for agriculture and in the Usambaras Mountains, from illegal gold mining activities.
