= Callulina laphami =

Conservation status
- Critically Endangered (IUCN 3.1)

Scientific classification
- Kingdom: Animalia
- Phylum: Chordata
- Class: Amphibia
- Order: Anura
- Family: Brevicipitidae
- Genus: Callulina
- Species: C. laphami

Binomial name
- Callulina laphami Loader, Gower, Ngalason, and Menegon, 2010

Species of amphibian

Callulina laphami is a species of frogs in the family Brevicipitidae. It was discovered in 2010 during a survey of rainforests in the northern part of the Eastern Arc Mountains of Tanzania. It is present at a single location in the Kindoroko and Minja Forest Reserves in the Pare Mountains. The forest area in which this frog lives is a remnant patch of a larger forest with trees in the surrounding area being felled for agricultural development, and the International Union for Conservation of Nature has rated the frog's conservation status as critically endangered.

== Description ==
Callulina laphami is a robust species of brevicipitid frog with a plump body and distinctive ridges of glands on its arms and legs. It has no tympani and no enlarged pads on the tips of its fingers and toes. Males have a snout-to-vent length of 23 to 29 mm (0.91 to 1.14 in) while females vary from 33 to 45 mm (1.30 to 1.77 in). This frog's dorsal surface is dark brown, its flanks are tan and its ventral surface yellowish-cream. In most individuals there is a red-coloured band between the eyes, but in some individuals, this band is green. The call, emitted by the male, is a rapid series of pulsed trills.

== Distribution ==
This frog is known only from a single block of undisturbed forest in the northern Pare Mountains near the border between Kenya and Tanzania, at altitudes between 1,730 and 2,000 m (5,700 and 6,600 ft); the forest block is formed by the Kindoroko and Minja Forest Reserves and is surrounded by land that has been cleared for settlement.

== Ecology ==
C. laphami is found in humid montane forests, sometimes occurring in the vicinity of streams and sometimes on drier ridges. It hides under rocks or logs during the day and at night can be found clambering in bushes and low trees a metre or two off the ground. Its breeding habits are unknown but it is likely that juvenile frogs develop directly from eggs laid on the ground without an intervening larval stage.

== Status ==
The block of forest in which C. laphami lives has an area of about 16.5 km^{2} (6.4 mi^{2}) and is surrounded by cleared land which is unsuitable habitat for this forest-dwelling species. Although the forest parcel consists of two forest reserves where the frog receives some protection, small-scale logging and human encroachment continues inside the reserve boundaries. At the moment the frog is present in reasonable numbers but its restricted range makes it at risk from even small alterations to its environment, and the International Union for Conservation of Nature gives its conservation status as critically endangered. Scientists attribute the habitat loss affecting the frog to urbanization, logging, and grazing.
