= Kanga Forest Reserve =

Nature reserve in Tanzania

- IUCN category Ib (wilderness area)
- Interactive map of Kanga Forest Reserve
- Coordinates: 5.933°S 37.733°E
- Area: 71.83 km^{2} (27.73 sq mi)
- Established: January 1, 1954

Kanga Forest Reserve is a forest reserve in the Nguru Mountains of Tanzania. It is around 71 square kilometres (27 sq mi) in area and was established in 1954.

The reserve is mostly forested from 400 to 2,400 metres elevation, and contains lowland, submontane, montane, and upper montane forests. The Kanga Forest Reserve is known scientifically as a "hotspot" for the diversity of its endemic amphibian and reptile species. The Reserve is the only known location of the endangered Kanga warty frog.

== See also ==
- 1954 in the environment
