= Bill Stanley (mammalogist) =

American mammalogist

William T. Stanley (c. 1957 – October 6, 2015) was an American mammalogist who was a manager of the collections at one of the world's largest natural history museums and a student of the mammals of eastern Africa. He was an evolutionary biologist and mammalogist, and at the time of his death was the director of the Field Museum of Natural History's Collections Center and the Collection Manager of the Field Museum's Collection of Mammals. Stanley studied the biogeography, ecology, evolution, and systematics of shrews, bats and rodents that live on mountains within Tanzania and surrounding countries.

== Biography and notable contributions ==
Stanley and colleagues discovered multiple species new to science, including shrews, bats, rodents, frogs and primates while surveying the fauna of the Eastern Arc Mountains. Stanley led the first-ever mammal surveys of various mountains in Tanzania, including Kilimanjaro, Meru, Ngorongoro, Udzungwa, and Rungwe. Two notable discoveries are the kipunji, the first new genus of African monkey in nearly 100 years, and Thor's hero shrew, the second species of mammal with a bizarre spinal morphology. Stanley created the innovative bi-lingual "Mammals of Tanzania" website that provides identification tools in English and Kiswahili for skulls and skins of mammals of the country.

Stanley organized and led faunal surveys in Democratic Republic of the Congo, Malawi, Kenya, Tanzania and Uganda. He led safaris for the Field Museum to the Serengeti.

== Awards and recognition ==
Stanley has one mouse (Lophuromys stanleyi) and one frog (Callulina stanleyi) named in his honor.

== Education ==
Stanley earned an MA at Humboldt State University (1986–1989) under the tutelage of Timothy E. Lawlor. His thesis focused on the evolution of chipmunks on mountains of the Great Basin. He received a BA (1981–1986) in Biology and Zoology from Humboldt State University. Stanley went to the International School of Kenya and was home schooled for a year by his mother while on safaris in various natural habitats of eastern Africa.

== Personal life ==
Stanley was born in Beirut, Lebanon, and was evacuated from the country at 2 years of age. He moved to Kenya with his family when he was 11 and stayed there for 8 years where he worked at the National Museums of Kenya, and the Nairobi National Park Animal Orphanage. Stanley and his family spent much of this time in the natural habitats of the country. After graduating from High School Stanley lived in Brunei, worked on Kibbutz Be'eri in Israel, and refurbished a century old farmhouse in central Virginia. He moved to Humboldt County, California in 1979 where he worked for the California Fish and Game Department surveying spawning salmonid fishes. In 1986, Stanley began working at the Humboldt State University Vertebrate Museum where he dissected and cleaned dead whale specimens that washed up on the beaches of Northern California. He moved to Chicago in 1989 to become Collection Manager, Mammals at the Field Museum of Natural History. He died, apparently of a heart attack, while on a collecting expedition in Ethiopia on October 6, 2015.
