= Ngorongoro Conservation Area =

Protected area and a World Heritage Site in Arusha Region, Tanzania

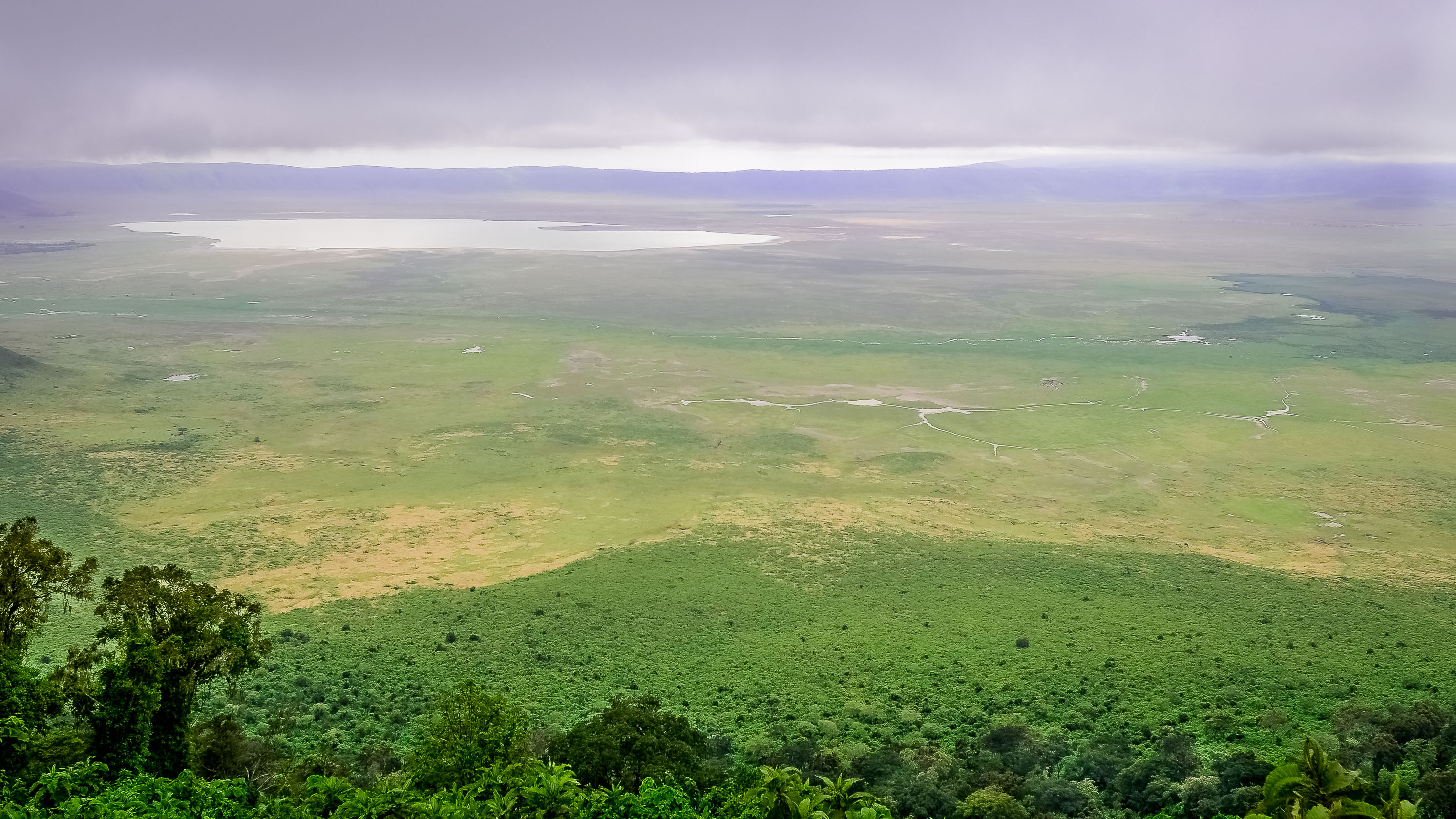
- View of the crater

- Location within Tanzania
- Location: Ngorongoro District, Arusha Region, Tanzania
- Coordinates: 03°12′36″S 35°27′36″E
- Area: 8,292 km^{2} (3,202 sq mi)
- Established: 1959
- Visitors: Over 500,000 per year
- Governing body: Ngorongoro Conservation Area Authority

UNESCO World Heritage Site
- Type: Mixed
- Criteria: (iv)(vii)(viii)(ix)(x)
- Designated: 1979 (3rd session)
- Reference no.: 39
- Region: Africa
- Endangered: 1984–1989

Ngorongoro Conservation Area (UK: /(ə)ŋˌɡɔːrəŋˈɡɔːroʊ/, US: /ɛŋˌɡɔːroʊŋˈɡɔːroʊ, əŋˌɡoʊrɔːŋˈɡoʊroʊ/) is a protected area and a UNESCO World Heritage Site located in Ngorongoro District, 180 km (110 mi) west of Arusha City in Arusha Region, within the Crater Highlands geological area of northeastern Tanzania. The area is named after Ngorongoro Crater, a large volcanic caldera within the area. The Ngorongoro Conservation Area Authority (NCAA), which administers the Ngorongoro Conservation Area (NCA), is an arm of the Tanzanian government and its boundaries follow the boundary of the Ngorongoro District in the Arusha Region. The western portion of the park abuts the Serengeti National Park (SNP). The area comprising the NCA, SNP, and Kenya's Maasai Mara game reserve is home to Great Migration, a massive annual migration of millions of wildebeest, zebras, gazelles, and other animals. The NCA also contains Olduvai Gorge, one of the most important paleoanthropological sites in the world.

Ngorongoro Conservation Area is one of the most popular attractions in Tanzania with 752,232 tourists visiting it in 2023.

The 2009 Ngorongoro Wildlife Conservation Act placed new restrictions on human settlement and subsistence farming in the Crater, displacing Maasai pastoralists, most of whom had been relocated to Ngorongoro from their ancestral lands to the north when the British colonial government established Serengeti National Park in 1959.

== History ==
The name of the crater has an onomatopoeic origin; it was named by the Maasai pastoralists after the sound produced by the cowbell (ngoro ngoro). Based on fossil evidence OH 7 found at the Olduvai Gorge, various hominid species have occupied the area for at least 1.75 million years.

Hunter-gatherers were replaced by pastoralists a few thousand years ago. The Iraqw people came to the area about 2,000 years ago and were joined by the Datooga around the year 1700. Both groups were driven from the area by the Maasai in the 1800s.

No Europeans are known to have set foot in the Ngorongoro Crater until 1892 when it was visited by Oscar Baumann. Two German brothers (Adolph and Friedrich Siedentopf) farmed in the crater until the outbreak of World War I, after leasing the land from the administration of German East Africa. The brothers regularly organized shooting parties to entertain their German friends. They also attempted to drive the wildebeest herds out of the crater.

The first game reserves were established by Germans and allowed hunting. Under British rule after World War I, various game preservation ordinances which restricted hunting were enacted in various areas in Tanzania (then Tanganyika) starting in 1921. By 1930, Ngorongoro Crater was included. Also during this time, the Land Ordinance of 1923 created legal basis to place the land rights of indigenous people at the discretion of the Governor, though indigenous people retained those rights through the 1950's. Tensions between the drive for preservation and the rights of indigenous people rose during this time.

The National Park Ordinance of 1948 (implemented in 1951), created the Serengeti National Park (SNP). However, to secure land rights for the pastoralist Maasai people living in the area, the Ngorongoro Conservation Area Ordinance (1959) separated the NCA from the SNP. Maasai people living in Serengeti National Park were systematically relocated to Ngorongoro Conservation Area, increasing the population of Maasai people living there. It also increased the disputes between the Tanzania government and the Maasai people.

The Ngorongoro Conservation Area Authority (NCAA) was established at the same time and manages the NCA and works to preserve it as a multi-use protected area. The NCAA's mission is to support the traditions of pastoral Maasai people, preserve the natural and cultural values of the Ngorongoro Conservation Area, and to promote and regulate tourism

The Ngorongoro Conservation Area became a UNESCO World Heritage Site in 1979, originally inscribed for its natural significance of wildlife and the Ngorongoro Crater. The NCA then received Mixed Heritage Status in 2010 due to the cultural significance of the anthropological importance of the Olduvai Gorge. This cultural recognition, however, has not included the Maasai community, hence the longstanding conflict surrounding the use and management of the park.

The Wildlife Conservation Act of 2009 further restricted human use of Ngorongoro Crater and created a legal framework to politically disenfranchise and forcibly displace traditional pastoralists. The International Union for Conservation of Nature (IUCN) is seeking solutions to ease conflict and improve collaborative efforts toward conservation with the locals.

Citing concerns about the preservation of the natural value of the NCA, starting in 2021, the Tanzanian government designed and then started implementing a plan to relocate all of the Maasai people in Ngorongoro Conservation Area to Msomera, a village 600 kilometers away. This is considered a voluntary relocation, however, Human Rights Watch reports that the government has acted in a coercive way without accordance to the principle of free, prior, and informed consent (FPIC).

== Geography ==
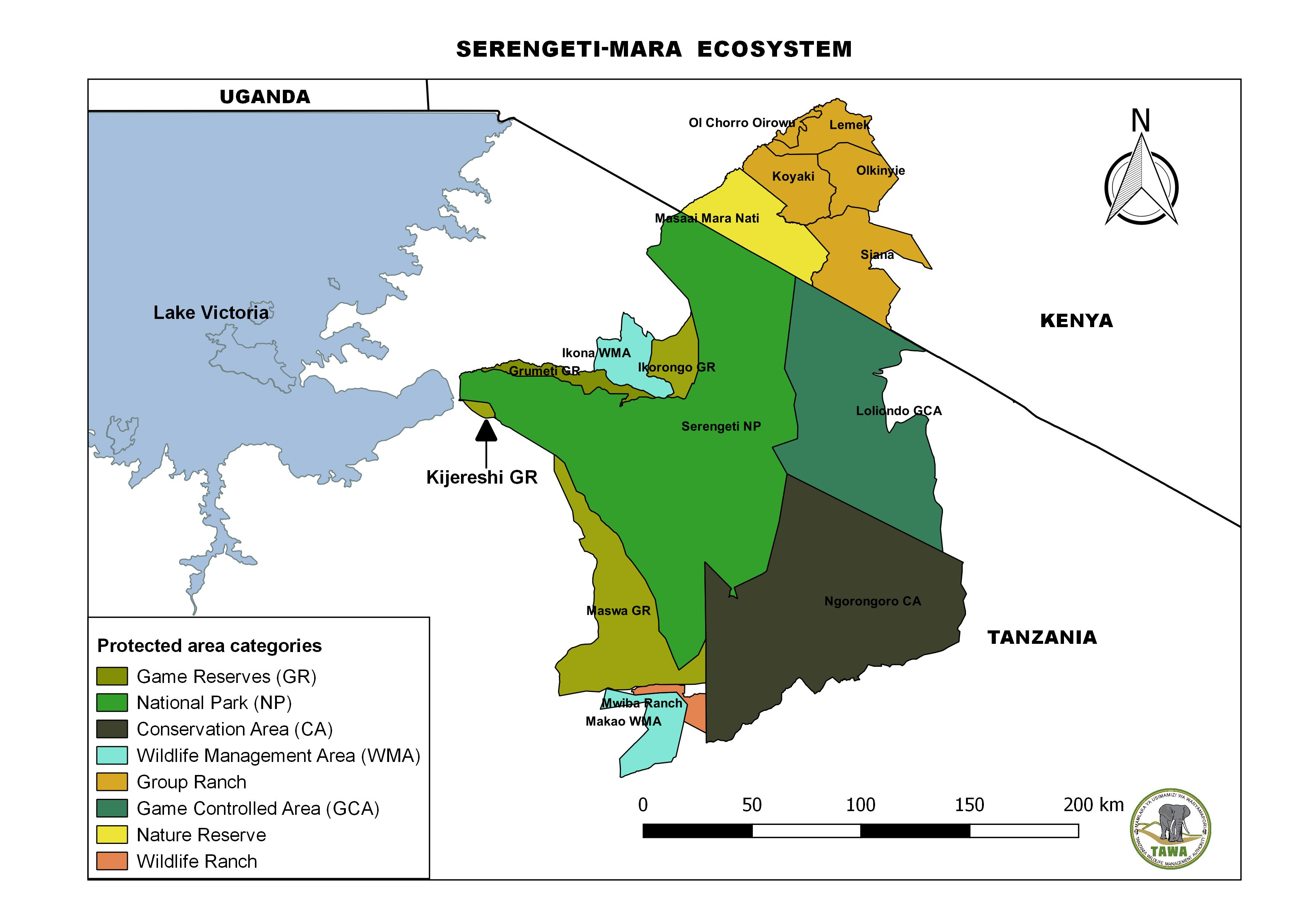
Serengeti Ecosystem

The Serengeti ecosystem includes multiple preserved areas in Tanzania. The Ngorongoro Conservation Area is in the southeast portion (shown in dark grey). The NCA adjoins the Serengeti National Park to the northwest and is contiguous with the SNP's southern Serengeti plains. These plains also extend to the north of the Ngorongoro Conservation Area into the unprotected Loliondo division and are kept open to wildlife through transhumance pastoralism practiced by the Maasai. The south and east of the NCA are volcanic highlands, including the famous Ngorongoro Crater and the lesser-known Empakaai Crater.

The southern and eastern boundaries of the Serengeti ecosystem are approximately defined by the rim of the East African Rift wall, which also prevents animal migration in these directions. In the topographical map, Lake Nyanza is the same as Lake Victoria in the Serengeti Ecosystem map.

=== Geology ===
East African Rift and Gregory Rift Topographical

The Pliocene Ngorongoro volcanic group consists of eight extinct shield volcanoes within the Eyasi half-graben, the eastern boundary marked by the Gregory Rift Western Escarpment. The Lake Eyasi escarpment bounds the half-graben on the southwest. Within the complex, five volcanoes are dome-shaped cones, while three have calderas. Ngorongoro Volcano (2.5–1.9 Ma) is primarily basaltic trachyandesite. The caldera is fed by the Munge and Oljoro Nyuki Rivers, while the Ngoitokitok hot springs feed into the Goringop swamp. Lake Magadi is a shallow (1.7 m) alkaline lake. Other volcanoes within the complex include Olmoti (2.01–1.79 Ma), Empakaai, Loolmalasin, Sadiman (3.7 Ma), Lemagrut, and Oldeani. The northwest portion of the NCA consists of the Serengeti Plains, the Salei Plains, the Oldupai Gorge, and the Gol Mountains inselbergs. These inselbergs are part of the Mozambique Belt quartzite and mica schist about (800–500 Ma) in age.

== Ngorongoro Crater ==
Ngorongoro Topographic Map

The main feature of the Ngorongoro Conservation Area is the Ngorongoro Crater, the world's largest inactive, intact and unfilled volcanic caldera. The crater, which formed when a large volcano erupted and collapsed on itself two to three million years ago, is 610 metres (2,000 feet) deep and its floor covers 260 square kilometres (100 square miles). Estimates of the height of the original volcano range from 4,500 to 5,800 metres (2.8 to 3.6 miles) high. The crater floor is 1,800 metres (5,900 feet) above sea level. The crater was voted by Seven Natural Wonders as one of the Seven Natural Wonders of Africa in Arusha, Tanzania, in February 2013. The Ngorongoro volcano was active from about 2.45 to 2 million years ago. Volcanic eruptions like that of Ngorongoro, which resulted in the formation of Ngorongoro Crater in Tanzania, were very common. Similar collapses occurred in the case of Olmoti and Empakaai, but they were much smaller in magnitude and impact. Out of the two recent volcanoes to the northeast of the Empakaai caldera, Kerimasi and Ol Doinyo Lengai, Doinyo Lengai is still active and had major eruptions in 2007 and 2008. Smaller ash eruptions and lava flows continue to slowly fill the current crater. Its name in Maasai means 'Mountain of God'. The Munge Stream drains Olmoti Crater to the north and is the main water source draining into the seasonal salt lake in the center of the crater. This lake is known by two names: Makat as the Maasai called it, meaning salt; and Magadi. The Lerai Stream drains the humid forests to the south of the Crater and feeds the Lerai Forest on the crater floor – when there is enough rain, the Lerai drains into Lake Magadi as well. Extraction of water by lodges and Ngorongoro Conservation Area headquarters reduces the amount of water entering Lerai by around 25%.

The other major water source in the crater is the Ngoitokitok Spring, near the eastern crater wall. There is a picnic site here open to tourists and a huge swamp fed by the spring, and the area is inhabited by hippopotamuses, elephants, lions, and many others. Many other small springs can be found around the crater's floor, and these are important water supplies for the animals and local Maasai, especially during times of drought. Maasai were previously permitted to graze their cattle within the crater, but as of 2015 were restricted from doing so.

== Olduvai Gorge ==
The Ngorongoro Conservation Area also protects Olduvai Gorge or Oldupai Gorge, situated in the plains area. It is considered to be the seat of humanity after the discovery of the earliest known specimens of the human genus, Homo habilis as well as early hominidae, such as Paranthropus boisei.

The Olduvai Gorge is a steep-sided ravine in the Great Rift Valley, which stretches along eastern Africa. Olduvai is in the eastern Serengeti Plains in northeastern Tanzania and is about 50 kilometres (31 mi) long. It lies in the rain shadow of the Ngorongoro highlands and is the driest part of the region. The gorge is named after 'Oldupaai', the Maasai word for the wild sisal plant, Sansevieria ehrenbergii.

It is one of the most important prehistoric sites in the world and research there has been instrumental in furthering understanding of early human evolution. Excavation work there was pioneered by Mary and Louis Leakey in the 1950s and is continued today by their family. Some believe that millions of years ago, the site was that of a large lake, the shores of which were covered with successive deposits of volcanic ash. Around 500,000 years ago seismic activity diverted a nearby stream which began to cut down into the sediments, revealing seven main layers in the walls of the gorge.

== Wildlife ==
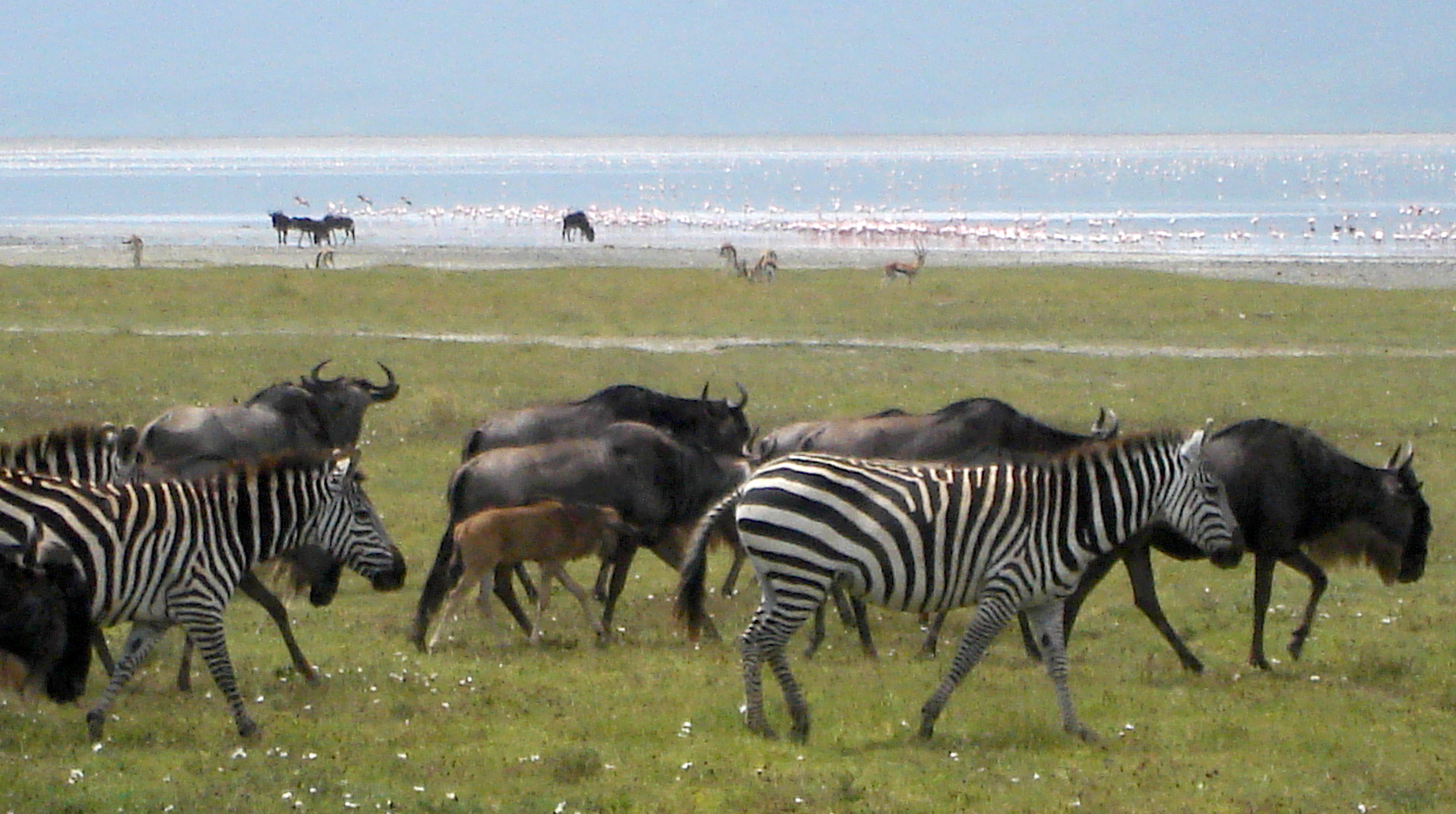
Wildebeest and zebra near Ngorongoro Crater lake

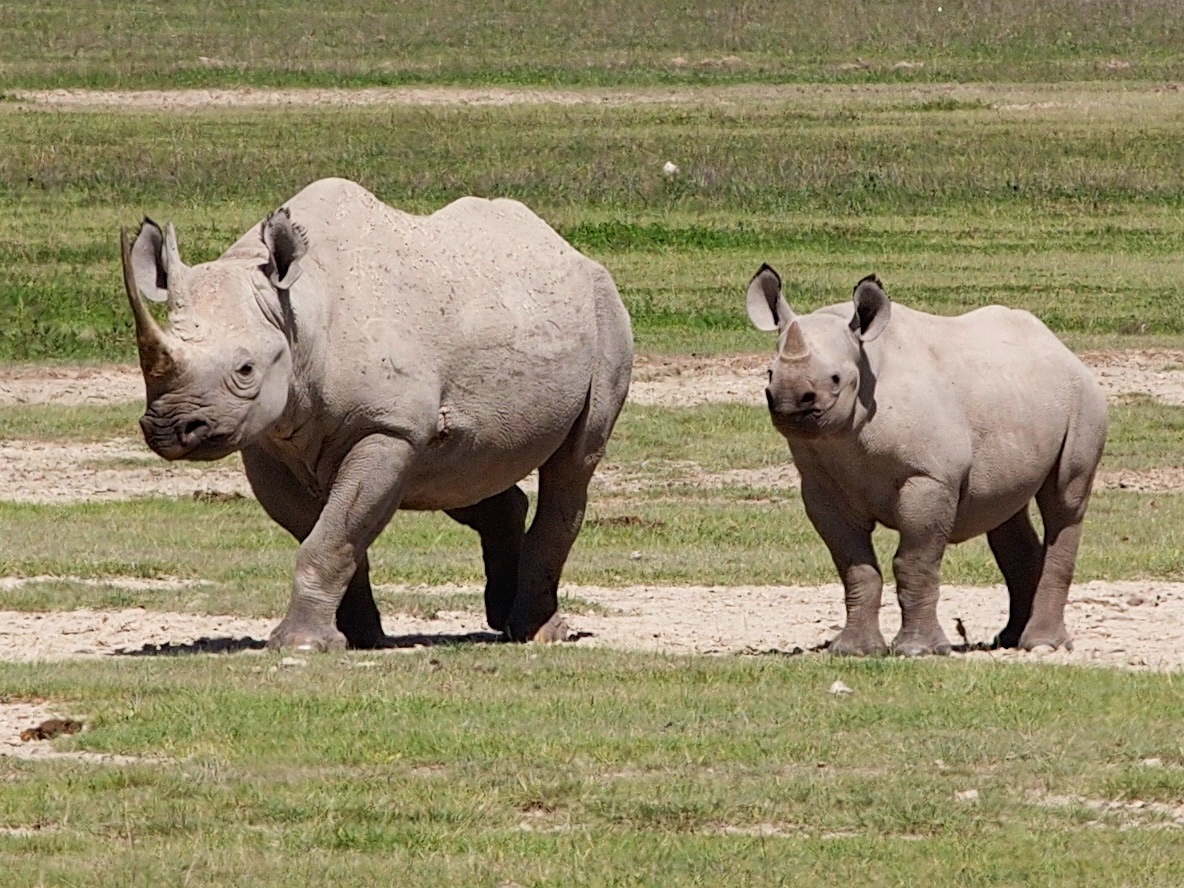
Rhinoceros in the Ngorongoro Conservation Area

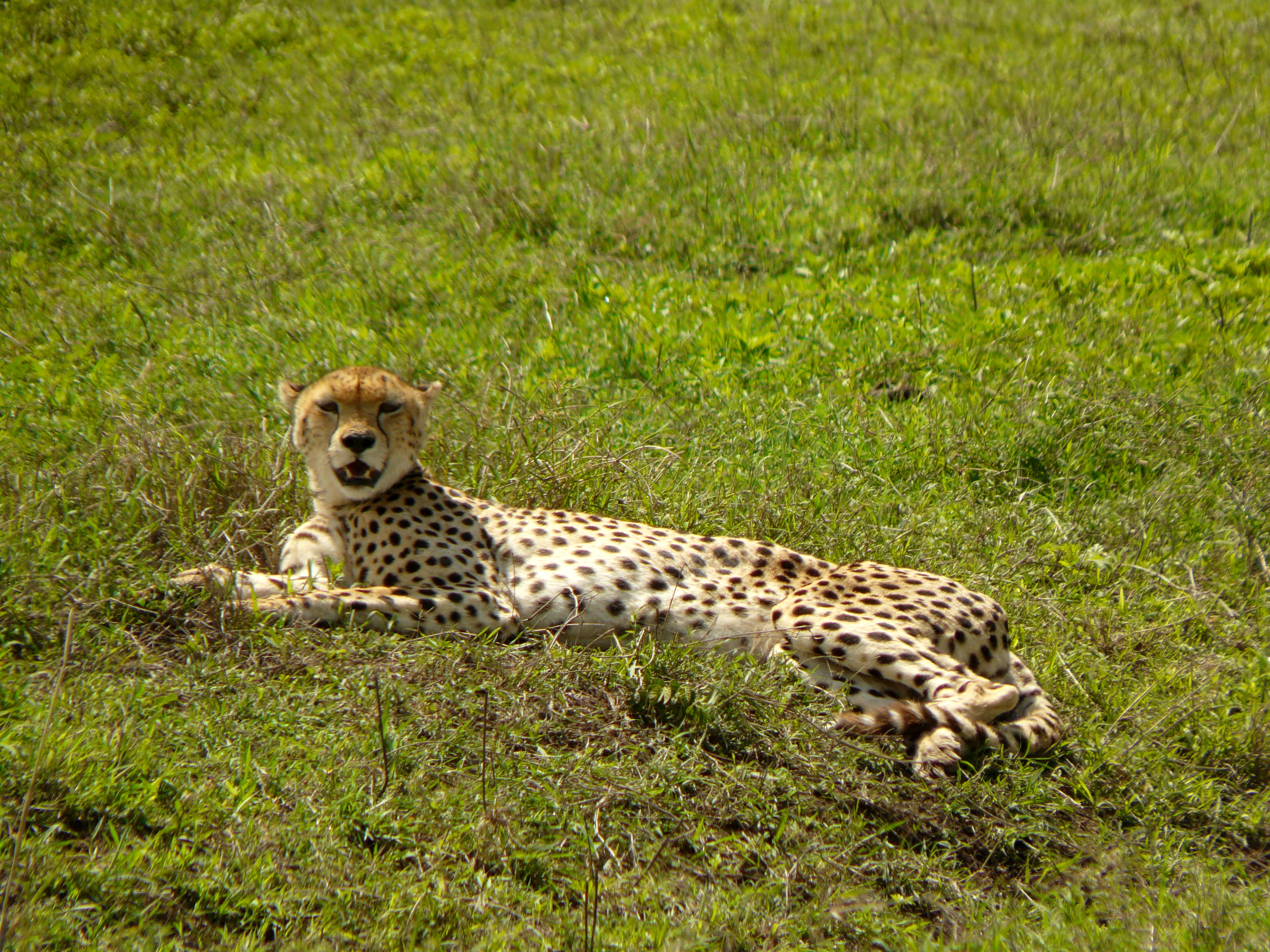
Cheetah in Ngorongoro

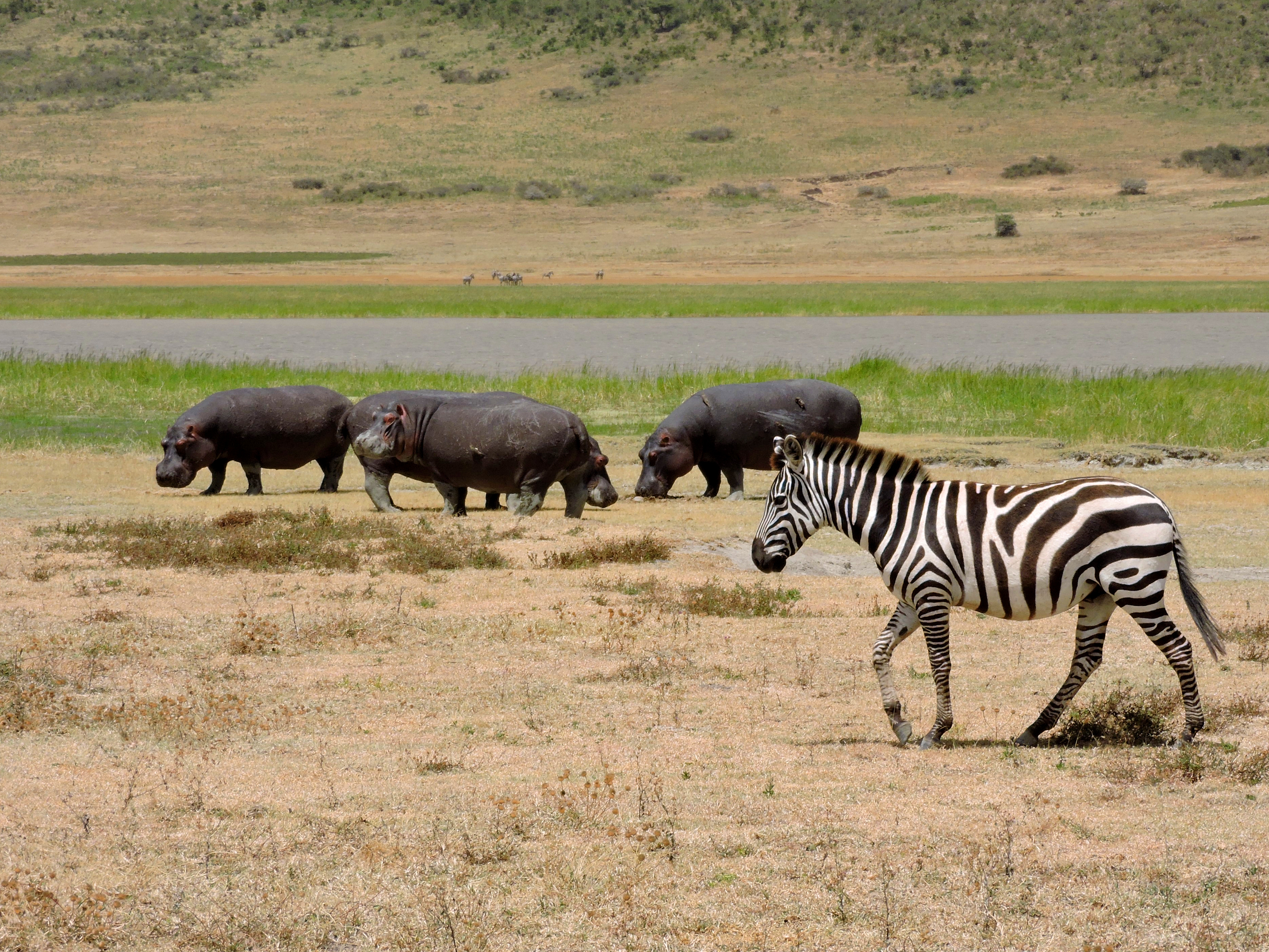
Hippos and zebra

Approximately 25,000 large animals, mostly ungulates, live in the crater. Large mammals in the crater include the black rhinoceros (Diceros bicornis michaeli), the local population of which declined from about 108 in 1964–66 to 13 in 1993. Following the monitoring and protection initiatives of the Frankfurt Zoological Society, International Rhino Foundation and World Wildlife Fund, the current total is 55 animals as of 2018.

Large mammals in the crater also include African buffalo or Cape buffalo (Syncerus caffer), and the hippopotamus (Hippopotamus amphibius). There also are many other ungulates: the blue wildebeest (Connochaetes taurinus) (7,000 estimated in 1994), Grant's zebra (Equus quagga boehmi) (4,000), the eland (Taurotragus oryx), and Grant's (Nanger granti) and Thomson's gazelles (Eudorcas thomsonii) (3,000). Waterbucks (Kobus ellipsiprymnus) occur mainly near Lerai Forest.

Absent are Giraffe, impala (Aepyceros melampus), topi (Damaliscus lunatus), oribi (Ourebia oribi), and crocodile (Crocodylus niloticus).

Cheetah (Acinonyx jubatus raineyi), East African wild dog (Lycaon pictus lupinus), and African leopard (Panthera pardus pardus) are rarely seen. Spotted hyenas (Crocuta crocuta) have been the subject of a long-term research study in the NCA since 1996.

Although thought of as "a natural enclosure" for a very wide variety of wildlife, 20 percent or more of the wildebeest and half the zebra populations vacate the crater in the wet season, while Cape buffalo (Syncerus caffer) stay; their highest numbers are during the rainy season.

Since 1986, the crater's wildebeest population has fallen from 14,677 to 7,250 (2003–2005). The numbers of eland and Thomson's gazelle also have declined while the buffalo population has increased greatly, probably due to the long prevention of fire which favors high-fibrous grasses over shorter, less fibrous types.

Serval (Leptailurus serval) occurs widely in the crater.

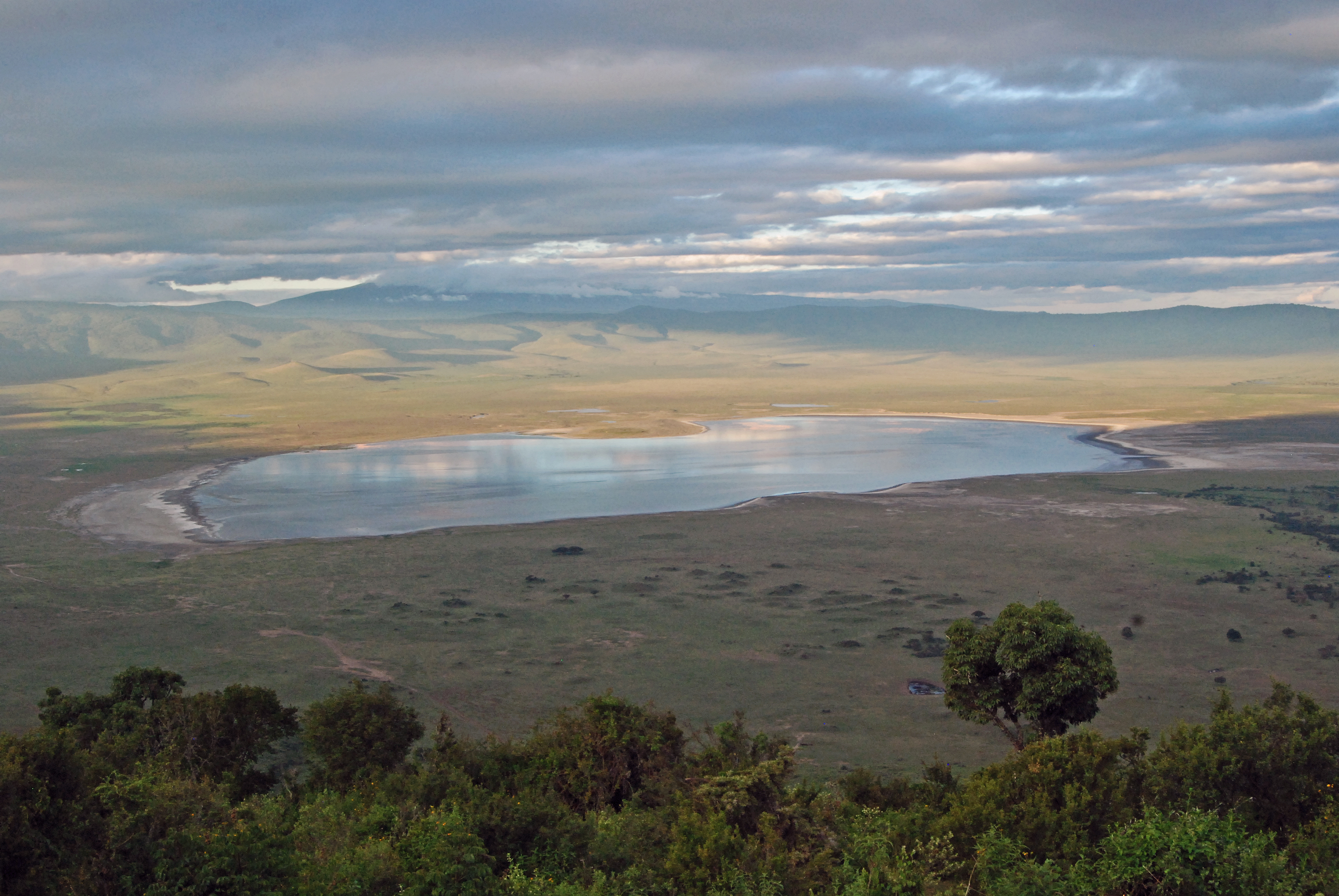
Lake Magadi (Ngorongoro)

Lake Magadi, a large lake in the southwest of the crater, is often inhabited by thousands of mainly lesser flamingoes.

The crater has one endemic species of mammal: Mduma's shrew (Crocidura mdumai), which is restricted to montane forests on the edge of the crater. This shrew is considered endangered due to deforestation from smallholder farming.

=== Lions ===
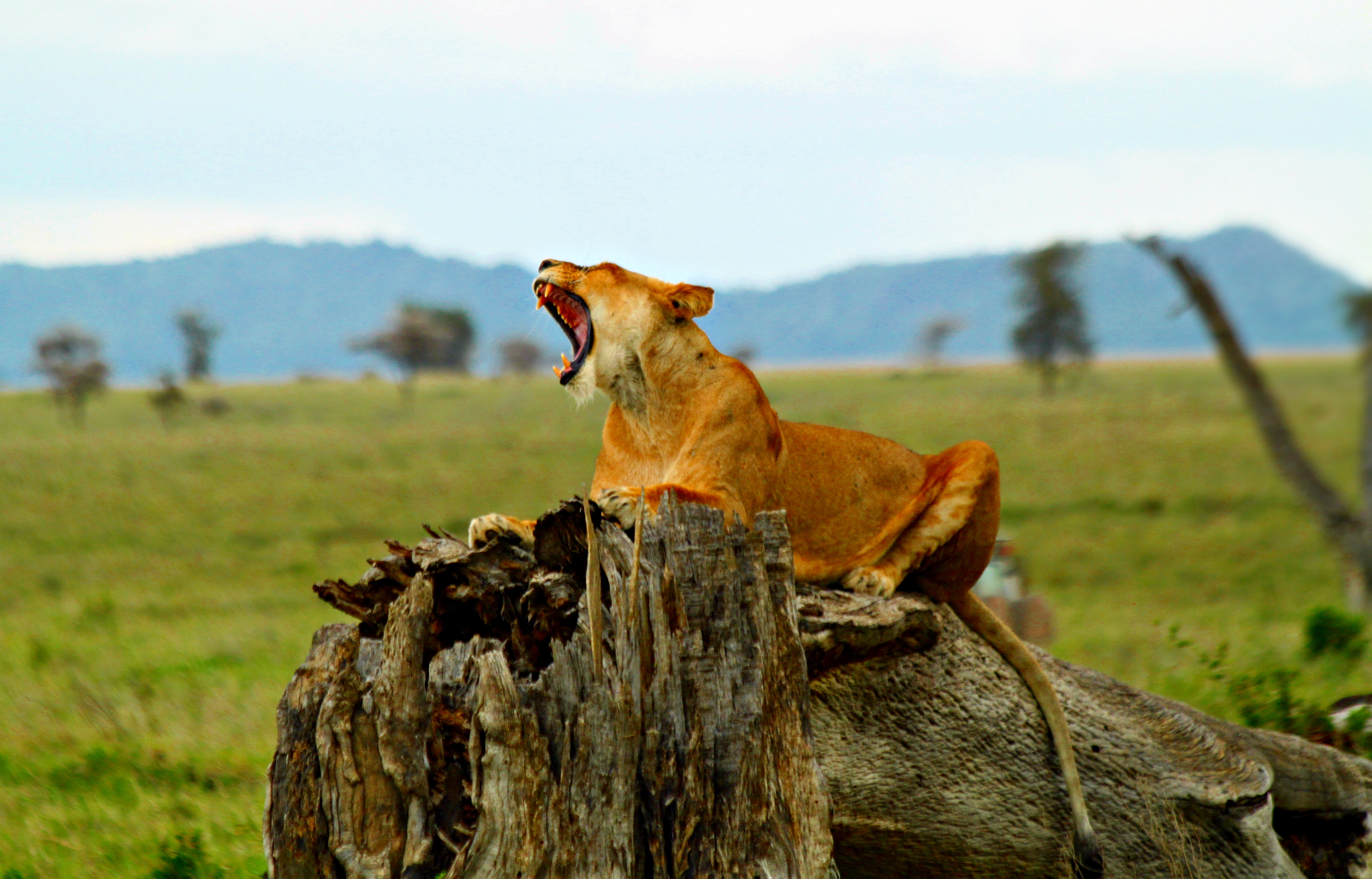
Lioness yawns in Ngorongoro Crater, Tanzania

The crater has one of the densest known population of lions, numbering 62 in 2001.

A side effect of the crater being a natural enclosure is that the lion population is significantly inbred. This is due to the very small amount of new bloodlines that enter the local gene pool, as very few migrating male lions enter the crater from the outside. Those who do enter the crater are often prevented from contributing to the gene pool by the crater's male lions, who expel any outside competitors.

Long-term data imply that lions in the crater were struck by four deadly disease outbreaks between 1962 and 2002. Drought in 1961 and rains throughout the 1962 dry season caused a massive build-up of blood-sucking stable flies (Stomoxys calcitrans) by May 1962. They drained blood and caused painful skin sores that became infected, causing lion numbers to crash from 75–100 to 12. The population recovered to around 100 by 1975 and remained stable until 1983 when a persistent decline began. Numbers have generally remained below 60 animals since 1993, reaching a low of 29 in 1998. In 2001, 34 percent of the lion population died between January and April from a combination of tick-borne disease and canine distemper.

The lion population is also influenced to some extent by the takeover of prides by incoming males, which typically kill small cubs. The biggest influence, however, appears to be disease, particularly canine distemper.

== Outside Ngorongoro Crater ==
The Ngorongoro Conservation Area has a healthy resident population of most species of wildlife, and Masai people. The Ndutu Lake area to the west of the conservation area has particularly strong cheetah and lion populations. Common in the area are hartebeest (Alcelaphus buselaphus), spotted hyena (Crocuta crocuta), and jackals. The population of African wild dog may have declined recently. Servals occur widely on the plains to the west of the Ngorongoro Crater.

The annual ungulate migration passes through the NCA, with 1.7 million wildebeest, 260,000 zebra, and 470,000 gazelles moving into the area in December and moving out in June. This movement changes seasonally with the rains, but the migration traverses almost the entire plains in search of food.

== Threats to the conservation area ==
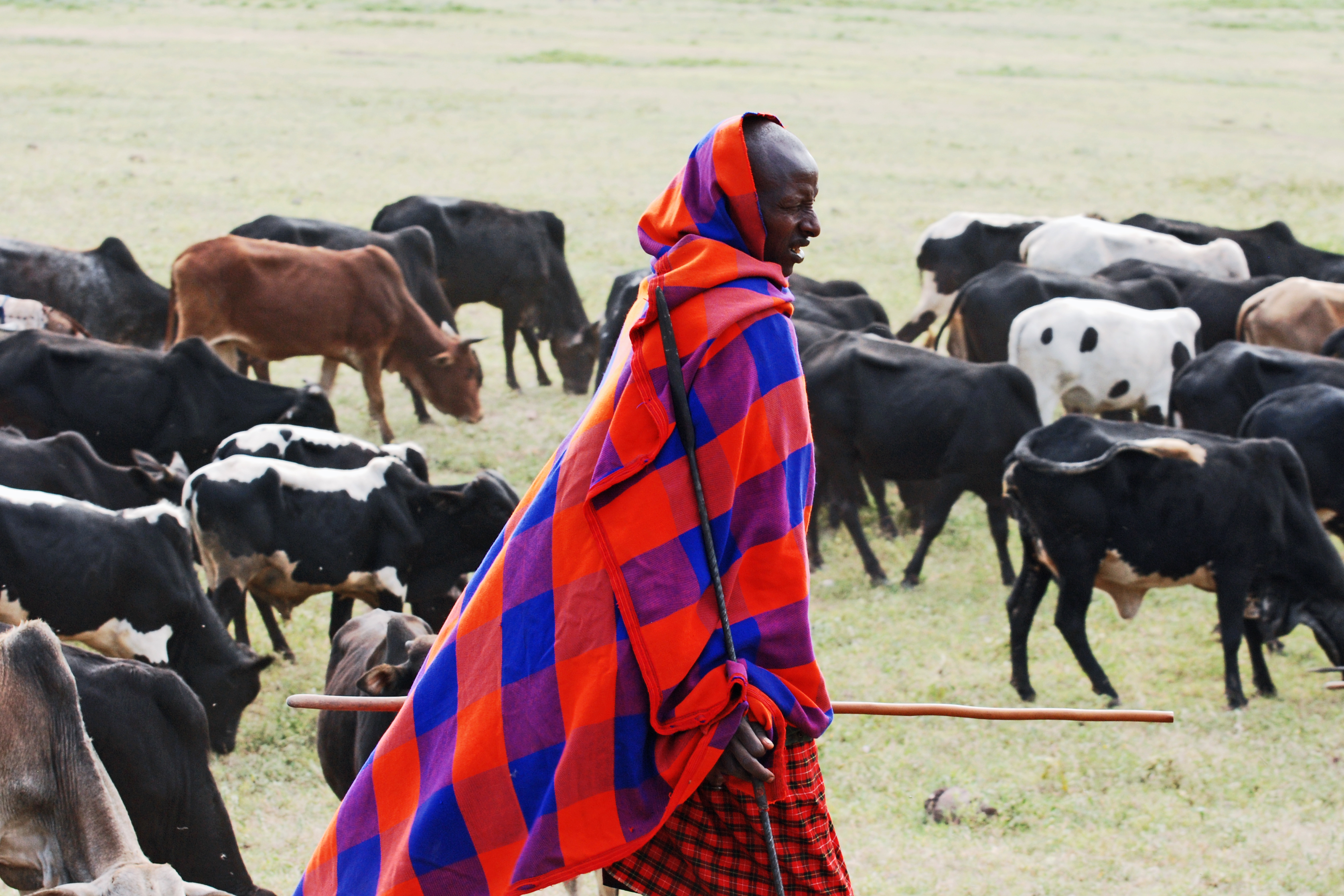
The Maasai taking their livestock into the Ngorongoro for grazing

The 2020 Conservation Outlook Assessment by the International Union for Conservation of Nature (IUCN) World Heritage Outlook identifies these concerns for the continued successful protection of Ngorongoro Conservation Area:

- Population increase of the pastoralist Maasai people
- Sustainable income from and management of tourism and visitation

The NCA is unique because it is the only conservation area in Tanzania that protects wildlife while allowing human habitation. Land use by the pastoralist Maasai people who live in the Ngorongoro Conservation Area is controlled to prevent negative effects on the wildlife population. For example, cultivation is prohibited at all but subsistence levels.

In 1966, the population of Maasai living in NCA was approximately 8,700. By 2017, the population had grown to 93,136 and it is projected to rise to 161,000 by 2027. This population increase is the root cause of other concerns including: increased livestock population and potential for overgrazing beyond the carrying capacity of the environment, unsustainable use of lumber from the land to build dwellings and other buildings, and the potential for reduction of scenic views due to this construction.

A potential solution to this issue involves the voluntary resettlement of Maasai to the village of Msomera 600 kilometers (370 miles) away. Efforts for this move started in 2021. The Ngorongoro Conservation Area Authority provides funds to those who choose to move, and the Maasai who move are also provided land for their homes, crops, and livestock. This resettlement has created conflict between those already living in Msomera and newcomers and also created concerns that the rights of all parties have not been retained.

The Ngorongoro Conservation Area Authority, which manages and preserves the Ngorongoro Conservation Area, relies highly on funding from tourism to maintain the NCA and disburse revenue-sharing to resident communities. Any fluctuation in tourism could negatively affect this income. New tourism records were reported in 2024 with a total of 752,232 visitors for the 2022/23 fiscal year.

Tourist visits are concentrated on the Ngorongoro Crater which takes up only a small part of the Ngorongoro Conservation Area. To reduce traffic to the crater, higher fees have been imposed per visiting vehicle, the number of vehicles allowed in the crater at one time is limited to 50, and vehicles are encouraged to carry more passengers. Tourist facilities are required to comply with various limitations to minimize impact.

== See also ==
- List of reduplicated place names
- List of Ngorongoro Crater plants
