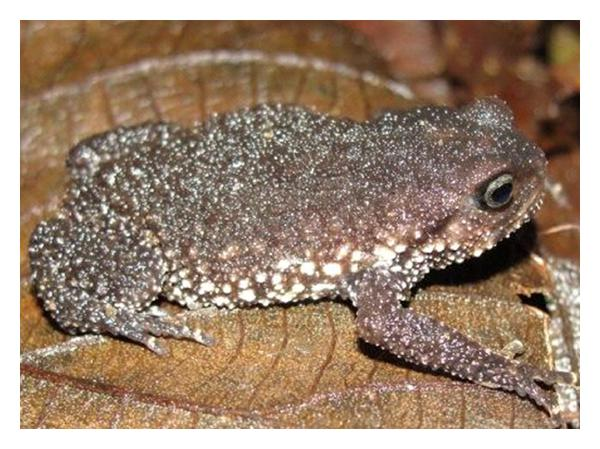

Conservation status
- Critically Endangered (IUCN 3.1)

Scientific classification
- Kingdom: Animalia
- Phylum: Chordata
- Class: Amphibia
- Order: Anura
- Family: Brevicipitidae
- Genus: Callulina
- Species: C. dawida

Binomial name
- Callulina dawida Loader, Measey, de Sá, and Malonza, 2009

= Callulina dawida =

Species of amphibian

Callulina dawida, also known as Taita warty frog, is a species of frogs in the family Brevicipitidae. It is endemic to Kenya, where it is only found in severely fragmented montane forests in Taita Hills in the south-eastern part of the country. Originally Callulina was thought to be monotypic and widely distributed through Eastern Arc Mountains in Tanzania and in southern Kenya. However, within the last decade eight new species have been identified, many which are considered critically endangered by IUCN. C. dawida was described in 2009 by a team led by Simon Loader; it received its specific name after Dawida language, which is spoken in Taita Hills.

== Description ==
Callulina dawida is a medium-sized frog in which females can reach 55 mm and males 35 mm. The toes of the hind feet are arranged in two opposable groups, with the fourth and fifth together, pointing backward when walking on the forest floor. The skin is warty and dorsal adult colour is variable from light brown, grey, dark brown, orange to yellowish. In terms of colouration there is no well-marked sexual dimorphism. Males have larger tympanum than females.

== Habitat ==
Callulina dawida is a high-elevation species occurring in indigenous forest fragments above 1400 m (4600 ft) within Dawida and Mbololo blocks of the Taita Hills. The species is most abundant in the high altitude, but is absent in typical farmland and plantation habitats. Callulina dawida is most active during the warm months of January to March and August to October and less so during the cold months of June and July. They are also less active during the peak rainy seasons in April and November/December, and especially in July, which is the coldest month in the Taita Hills.

Callulina dawida is a solitary species. Movement is limited in this species justifying its survival in tiny forest patches. The frogs are good climbers and may perch higher than 1 m on tree stems.

== Breeding ==
Callulina dawida start breeding with calls mainly during the long dry season from around July. The call is a fast repeated "brrr brr brr...", with the peak frequency at 1.6 kHz. Then egg clutch is deposited on leaf litter nests in September and the mother broods them for three months until November. Callulina dawida, like other brevicipitids, deposit relatively small clutches of large yolk-rich eggs that are buffered by infertile jelly-filled egg capsules, possibly to prevent the fertile eggs from desiccation during the dry period. Eggs hatch at different times and the young ones immediately leave the nest site. After hatching around November the froglets are grown-up enough to move around and be easily detected in January and February. Callulina dawida reaches sexual maturity within eight months of hatching.

== Conservation ==
Callulina dawida has been evaluated by IUCN as a critically endangered species because its small and fragmented range and ongoing deterioration and loss of its habitat. There are plans to replant several pine and eucalyptus plantations with native tree species.
