= Chome Forest Reserve =

Nature reserve in the Pare Mountains, Tanzania

Chome Forest Reserve is a forest reserve of Tanzania in the Pare Mountains of Kilimanjaro Region. It is located between the West Usambaras and the North Pare Mountains. It lies in Pare District of Kilimanjaro Region.

The highest altitude in the reserve has Shengena Peak. It covers 14,231 hectares of various forest types. Chome Forest Reserve has numerous bird species. The reserve sits in the part of the Eastern Arc Mountains, nominated for the World Heritage List in 2010. There is a direct climatic influence of the Indian Ocean. The area has been logged for many years. It is surrounded by numerous villages. It harbours several types of monkey.
