= Index of protected areas of South Africa =

Alphabetical listing of articles about protected areas in South Africa

The following index is provided as an overview of and topical guide to the protected areas of South Africa:

A protected area of South Africa is an area of land, coastline or ocean within the exclusive economic zone (EEZ) of the Republic of South Africa that is protected in terms of specific legislation.

== A ==
- Addo Elephant National Park – Wildlife conservation park near Gqeberha in the Eastern Cape, South Africa
- Addo Elephant National Park Marine Protected Area – Marine conservation area in the Eastern Cape in South Africa
- Agulhas Bank Complex Marine Protected Area – Offshore marine conservation area south of Cape Agulhas in South Africa
- Agulhas Front Marine Protected Area – Offshore marine conservation area off the Eastern Cape in South Africa's EEZ
- Agulhas Muds Marine Protected Area – Marine conservation area offshore of the Western Cape in South Africa
- Agulhas National Park – Park in South Africa
- Ai-Ais/Richtersveld Transfrontier Park – Transfrontier park in Namibia and South Africa
- Aliwal Shoal Marine Protected Area – Marine conservation area at Aliwal Shoal off the coast of KwaZulu-Natal, South Africa
- Aliwal Shoal Offshore Marine Protected Area – 2019 extension to the Aliwal Shoal Marine Protected Area
- Amathole Offshore Marine Protected Area – Marine conservation area in the Eastern Cape in South Africa
- Augrabies Falls National Park – National park in the Northern Cape, South Africa

== B ==
- Benguela Mud Marine Protected Area – Marine conservation area off the Western Cape province of South Africa
- Betty's Bay Marine Protected Area – Marine conservation area in the Western Cape in South Africa
- Bird Island Marine Protected Area – Marine conservation area in the Eastern Cape in South Africa
- Bontebok National Park – National park near Swellendam in the Western Cape, South Africa
- Botanical Garden University of Stellenbosch
- Browns Bank Corals Marine Protected Area – Marine conservation area on the continental slope of South Africa

== C ==
- Camdeboo National Park – National park at Graaff-Reinet in the Eastern Cape, South Africa
- Cape Canyon Marine Protected Area – Marine conservation area off the coast of South Africa
- Childs Bank Marine Protected Area – Marine conservation area off the west coast of South Africa

== D ==
- De Hoop Marine Protected Area – Marine conservation area on the coast of South Africa
- Drakensberg Botanic Garden
- Durban Botanic Gardens – Africa's oldest surviving botanical gardens, in South Africa
- Dwesa-Cwebe Marine Protected Area – Coastal marine conservation area in the Eastern Cape, South Africa

== F ==
- Free State National Botanical Garden – National Botanical Garden just outside Bloemfontein, South Africa

== G ==
- The Garden Route Botanical Garden
- Garden Route National Park – Coastal national park in South Africa
- Golden Gate Highlands National Park – National park in South Africa
- Goukamma Marine Protected Area – Marine conservation area the Western Cape in South Africa
- Great Limpopo Transfrontier Park – Transfrontier park in South Africa, Mozambique and Zimbabwe
- Greater Mapungubwe Transfrontier Conservation Area – Transfrontier conservation area in South Africa, Botswana and Zimbabwe

== H ==
- Harold Porter National Botanical Garden – Conservation area at Betty's Bay in the Western Cape, South Africa
- Helderberg Marine Protected Area – Marine conservation area in the Western Cape in South Africa
- Hluleka Marine Protected Area – Marine conservation area in the Eastern Cape in South Africa

== I ==
- iSimangaliso Marine Protected Area – Marine conservation area in northern kwaZulu-Natal in South Africa
- iSimangaliso Offshore Marine Protected Area – Large 2019 extension to the iSimangaliso marine protected area

== J ==
- Johannesburg Botanical Garden – Botanical garden in Emmarentia, Johannesburg, South Africa
- Jutten Island Marine Protected Area – Marine conservation area in Saldanha Bay in South Africa

== K ==
- Karoo Desert National Botanical Garden – Botanical garden focused on succulents and other plants of arid regions
- Karoo National Park – Wildlife reserve in the Great Karoo area of the Western Cape, South Africa near Beaufort West
- Kgalagadi Transfrontier Park – Transfrontier conservation area in Botswana and South Africa
- Kirstenbosch National Botanical Garden – Botanical garden at the foot of Table Mountain in Cape Town
- Kruger National Park – First national park in South Africa
- KwaZulu-Natal National Botanical Garden – Botanical garden in Pietermaritzburg, South Africa

== L ==
- Langebaan Lagoon Marine Protected Area – Marine conservation area in the Langebaan lagoon in the Western Cape province of South Africa
- Lowveld National Botanical Garden – Botanical garden near Mbombela in Mpumalanga, South Africa
- Lubombo Transfrontier Conservation Area – Conservation area in KwaZulu-Natal, Mozambique and Swaziland

== M ==
- Malgas Island Marine Protected Area – Marine conservation area on the west coast in the Western Cape province in South Africa
- Maloti-Drakensberg Transfrontier Conservation Area – International park in Lesotho and South Africa
- Manie van der Schijff Botanical Garden – Botanical garden in Pretoria, South Africa
- Mapungubwe National Park – National park in Limpopo, South Africa
- Marakele National Park – National Park that is part of the Waterberg Biosphere in Limpopo Province, South Africa
- Marcus Island Marine Protected Area – Marine conservation area in the Western Cape in South Africa
- Mokala National Park – Reserve in the Plooysburg area south-west of Kimberley in the Northern Cape, South Africa
- Mountain Zebra National Park – National park in the Eastern Cape province of South Africa

== N ==
- Namaqua Fossil Forest Marine Protected Area – Marine conservation area off the northwest coast of the Northern Cape province of South Africa
- Namaqua National Park – South African national park in Namaqualand in the Northern Cape
- Namaqua National Park Marine Protected Area – Marine conservation area in Namaqualand in the Northern Cape, in South Africa
- North-West University Botanical Garden – Botanical Garden on the Potchefstroom Campus of the North-West University
- Nsubane Pongola Transfrontier Conservation Area – Proposed protected area in South Africa and Swaziland

== O ==
- Orange Shelf Edge Marine Protected Area – Marine conservation area off the Northern Cape in South Africa

== P ==
- Pondoland Marine Protected Area – Marine conservation area in the Eastern Cape province of South Africa
- Port Elizabeth Corals Marine Protected Area – Marine conservation area off the Eastern Cape in South Africa
- Pretoria National Botanical Garden – Garden in eastern Pretoria, Gauteng
- Prince Edward Islands Marine Protected Area – Marine conservation area in the waters of the Prince Edward Islands in the southern Indian Ocean
- Protea Banks Marine Protected Area – Marine conservation area in the coastal waters of southern kwaZulu-Natal in South Africa

== R ==
- Robben Island Marine Protected Area – Marine conservation area in South Africa
- Robberg Marine Protected Area – Coastal conservation area in the Western Cape of South Africa

== S ==
- Sardinia Bay Marine Protected Area – Marine conservation area in the Eastern Cape in South Africa
- Sixteen Mile Beach Marine Protected Area – Marine conservation area the Western Cape in South Africa
- Songimvelo-Malolotja Transfrontier Conservation Area – Peace park on the South Africa - Swaziland border between Barberton and Pigg's Peak
- Southeast Atlantic Seamounts Marine Protected Area – Marine conservation area in the South Atlantic in the South African EEZ
- Southwest Indian Seamounts Marine Protected Area – Marine conservation area south of Stilbaai in the Western Cape in South Africa
- Stilbaai Marine Protected Area – Marine conservation area in the Western Cape in South Africa

== T ==
- Table Mountain National Park – Nature conservation area on the Cape Peninsula in Cape Town, South Africa
- Table Mountain National Park Marine Protected Area – Marine conservation area around the Cape Peninsula in South Africa
- Tankwa Karoo National Park – Conservation area west of Sutherland in the Western and Northern Cape
- Trafalgar Marine Protected Area – Marine conservation area (in region) in South Africa
- Tsitsikamma Marine Protected Area – Marine conservation area on the south coast of South Africa

== U ==
- University of KwaZulu-Natal Botanical Garden – Botanical garden in Pietermaritzburg, KwaZulu-Natal
- Usuthu-Tembe-Futi Transfrontier Conservation Area – Group of protected areas in southern Africa
- uThukela Banks Marine Protected Area – Marine conservation area off the coast of kwaZulu-Natal in South Africa

== W ==
- Walker Bay Whale Sanctuary – Marine conservation area in the Western Cape province in South Africa
- Walter Sisulu National Botanical Garden – Botanical reserve in Roodepoort near Johannesburg
- West Coast National Park – Nature reserve north of Cape Town in the Western Cape province of South Africa

World heritage sites

- Fossil Hominid Sites of Sterkfontein, Swartkrans, Kromdraai, and Environs
- Cape Floristic Region Protected Areas
- iSimangaliso Wetland Park
- Mapungubwe Cultural Landscape
- Richtersveld Cultural and Botanical Landscape
- Robben Island
- uKhahlamba/Drakensberg Park
- Vredefort Dome
