= List of botanical gardens in South Africa =

This list of botanical gardens in South Africa is intended to include all significant botanical gardens and arboretums in South Africa.

Garden	Province	Date established	Coordinates	Notes
Makana Botanical Gardens	Eastern Cape	1853	33.3156°S 26.5209°E	
Free State National Botanical Garden	Free State	1967	29°03′08″S 26°12′39″E	
Johannesburg Botanical Garden	Gauteng	1968	26.15°S 28.00°E	
Pretoria National Botanical Garden	Gauteng	1946	25°44′19″S 28°16′24″E	
Walter Sisulu National Botanical Garden	Gauteng	1982	26.087°S 27.84°E	
Manie van der Schijff Botanical Garden-University of Pretoria	Gauteng	1934	25°45′07″S 28°13′44″E	
Durban Botanic Gardens	KwaZulu-Natal	1849	29°50′48″S 31°00′24″E	
University of KwaZulu-Natal Botanical Garden	KwaZulu-Natal	1983	29°37′30″S 30°24′14″E	
KwaZulu-Natal National Botanical Garden	KwaZulu-Natal	1874	29°36′28″S 30°20′48″E	
Lowveld National Botanical Garden	Mpumalanga	1969	25°26′40″S 30°57′58″E	
North-West University Botanical Garden	North West	1962	26°40′55″S 27°05′43″E	
Hantam National Botanical Garden	Northern Cape	2007	31°23′50″S 19°10′12″E	
Kirstenbosch National Botanical Garden	Western Cape	1913	33°59′22″S 18°25′49″E	
Karoo Desert National Botanical Garden	Western Cape	1921	33°36′58″S 19°27′03″E	
Harold Porter National Botanical Garden	Western Cape	1959	34°21′06″S 18°55′37″E	
Garden Route Botanical Garden	Western Cape	1996	33°56′50″S 22°27′48″E	
Stellenbosch University Botanical Garden	Western Cape	1902	33°56′10″S 18°51′51″E	since 1922 at current site
Kwelera National Botanical Garden	Eastern Cape	2014	32°54′32″S 28°04′13″E	
Thohoyandou National Botanical Garden	Limpopo	2014	22°57′47.2″S 30°27′57.4″E	

== See also ==
- Protected areas of South Africa
- List of botanical gardens
- List of tourist attractions worldwide
