= Hantam National Botanical Garden =

Botanical Garden just outside Nieuwoudtville in the Northern Cape, South Africa

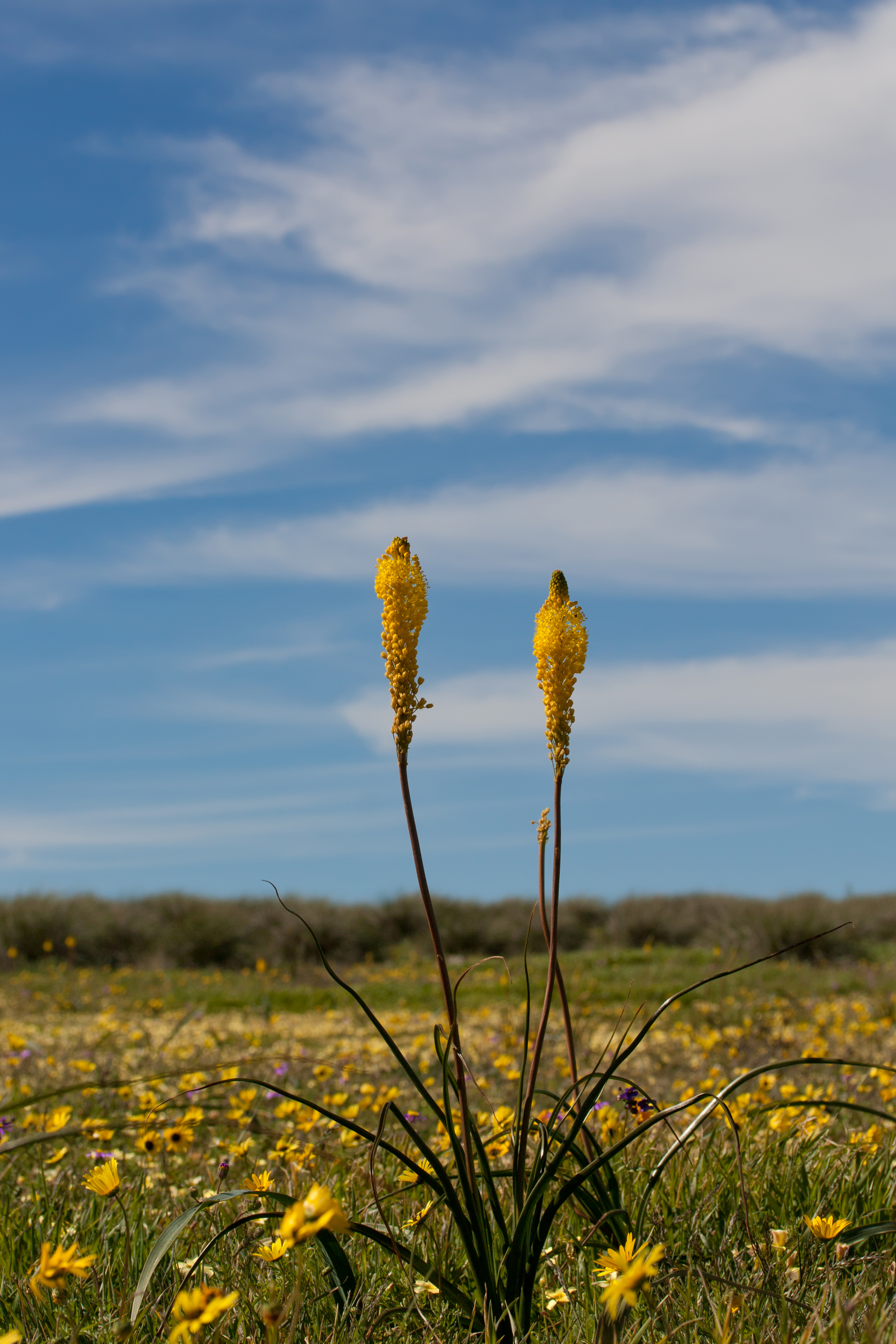
- Type: Botanical garden
- Location: Nieuwoudtville
- Coordinates: 31°23′58.8″S 19°10′07.6″E
- Area: 6,200 hectares (15,000 acres)
- Established: Katlaagte 1883; 143 years ago; Glenlyon 1968; 58 years ago; Hantam National Botanical Garden 2007; 19 years ago
- Opened: 2008
- Administrator: SANBI
- Hiking trails: Nine
- Website: www.sanbi.org/gardens/hantam/
- Hantam National Botanical Garden (South Africa) Hantam National Botanical Garden (Northern Cape)

The Hantam National Botanical Garden is situated outside Nieuwoudtville. It is the first National Botanical Garden in the Northern Cape. The main section of the garden is 5 km south-east of the town, neighbouring the Oorlogskloof Nature Reserve.

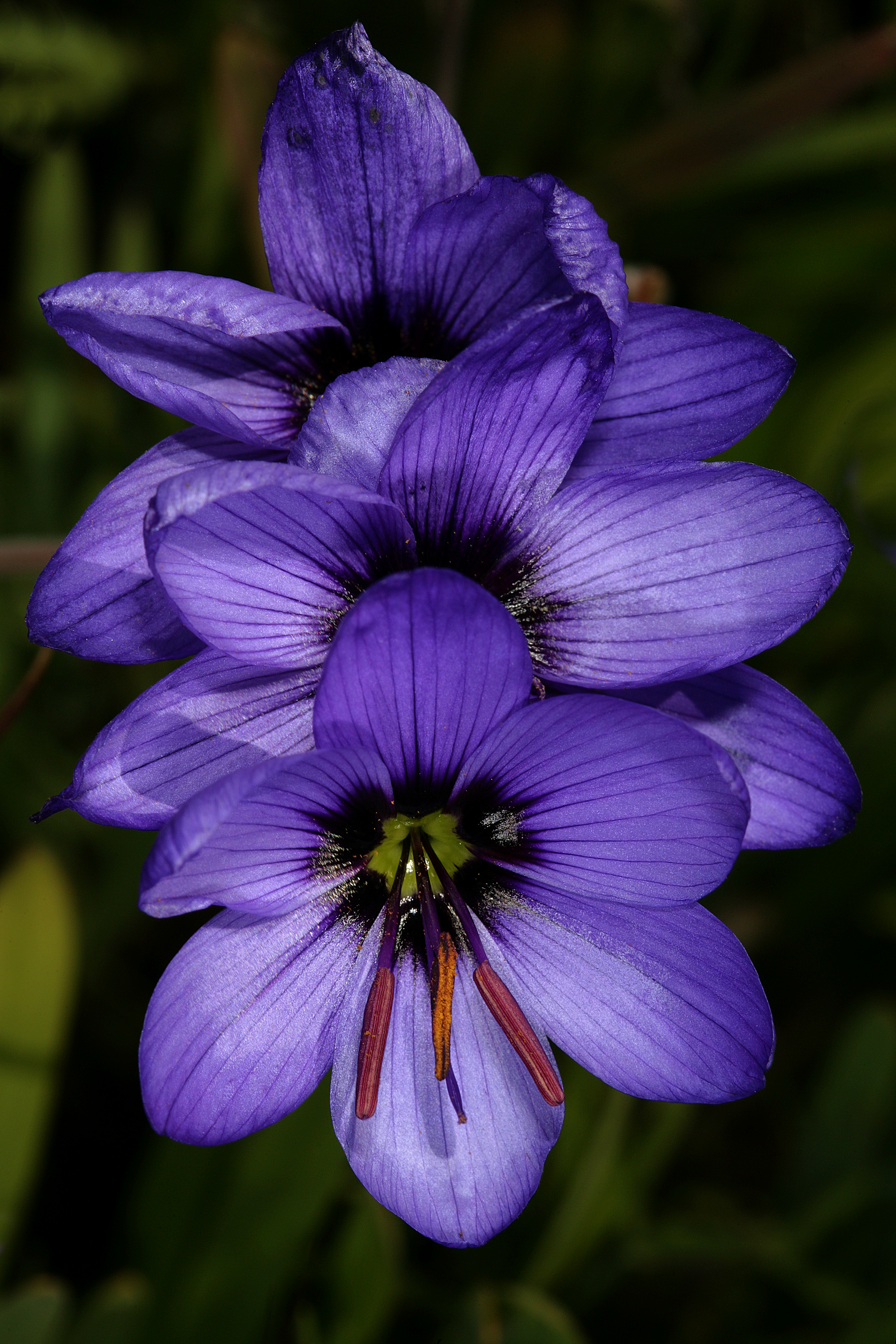
Blue Pride-of-Nieuwoudtville found in the area.

The winter rains on the Bokkeveld Plateau lead to massive blooms from August to the middle of October. 1,350 plant species are recorded here, including the Blue Pride-of-Nieuwoudtville. The garden has many bulbs and the geology includes formations in dolerite outcroppings.

Birds from 150 species visit here, such as the blue crane, Ludwig's bustard, secretarybird and the endangered black harrier. Cape foxes, baboons, steenboks, and the Cape porcupine are also found within the grounds.

It is the only national botanical garden in the Northern Cape and covers 6,200 ha, mostly covered with renosterveld. Nine hiking trails run through the park.

== See also ==
- List of botanical gardens in South Africa
- Hantam karoo
- List of protected areas of South Africa
