= Stellenbosch University Botanical Garden =

Oldest university botanical garden in South Africa

- Universiteit Stellenbosch Botaniese Tuin
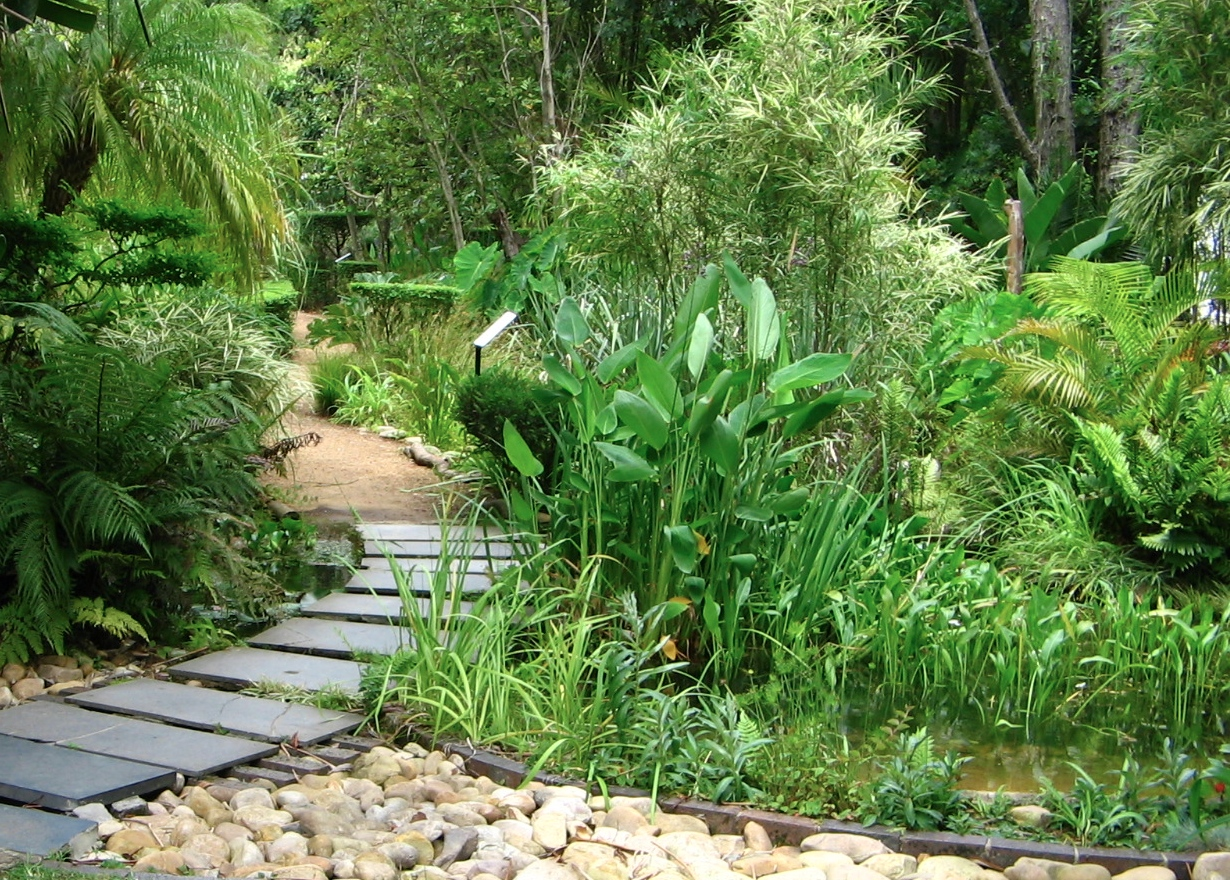
- Pathway through the lush vegetation in the Stellenbosch University Botanical Garden

- Location within South Africa
- Location: Stellenbosch, Western Cape, South Africa
- Coordinates: 33°56′10″S 18°51′55″E
- Elevation: 122 metres (400 ft)
- Operator: Stellenbosch University
- Website: www.sun.ac.za/botanicalgarden

The Stellenbosch University Botanical Garden, located in the historical center of Stellenbosch, is the oldest university botanical garden in South Africa. The Garden is relatively small and houses an enormous diversity of plants, both indigenous to South Africa and introduced species. It is open to the public.

== History ==
The history of the Stellenbosch University Botanical Garden dates back to 1902, when lecturer Augusta Vera Duthie grew plants next to the then–Main Building on campus for research and student practicals. The Botanical Garden's current site dates back to 1922, when Gert Cornelius Nel, professor of botany at the time, convinced the University Council to allocate land for the establishment of the Garden. Hans Herre was appointed as the first curator of the Garden in 1925. Curators of the botanical garden included Hans Herre (1925–1962), Wim Tijmens (1962–1999), Deon Kotze (1999–2012), Martin Smit (2013–2018), and Donovan Kirkwood (2018–2025).

== Key functions and activities ==
The Stellenbosch University Botanical Garden fulfills many functions within the university and the local community. The garden supports the research and training of students within Stellenbosch University and increasingly has a strong conservation focus, working on species on the brink of extinction. In 2018 the garden was accredited as a Conservation Practitioner by Botanic Gardens Conservation International (BGCI). The local community and other visitors also use the garden for both relaxation and education.

Some facilities in the garden include the Botanical Garden Shop, which functions as a visitor center but also sells various books, seeds, and local plant products; a small specialist nursery; and the Katjiepiering Restaurant. The garden itself is also utilized for sculpture exhibitions.

== Plant collections ==
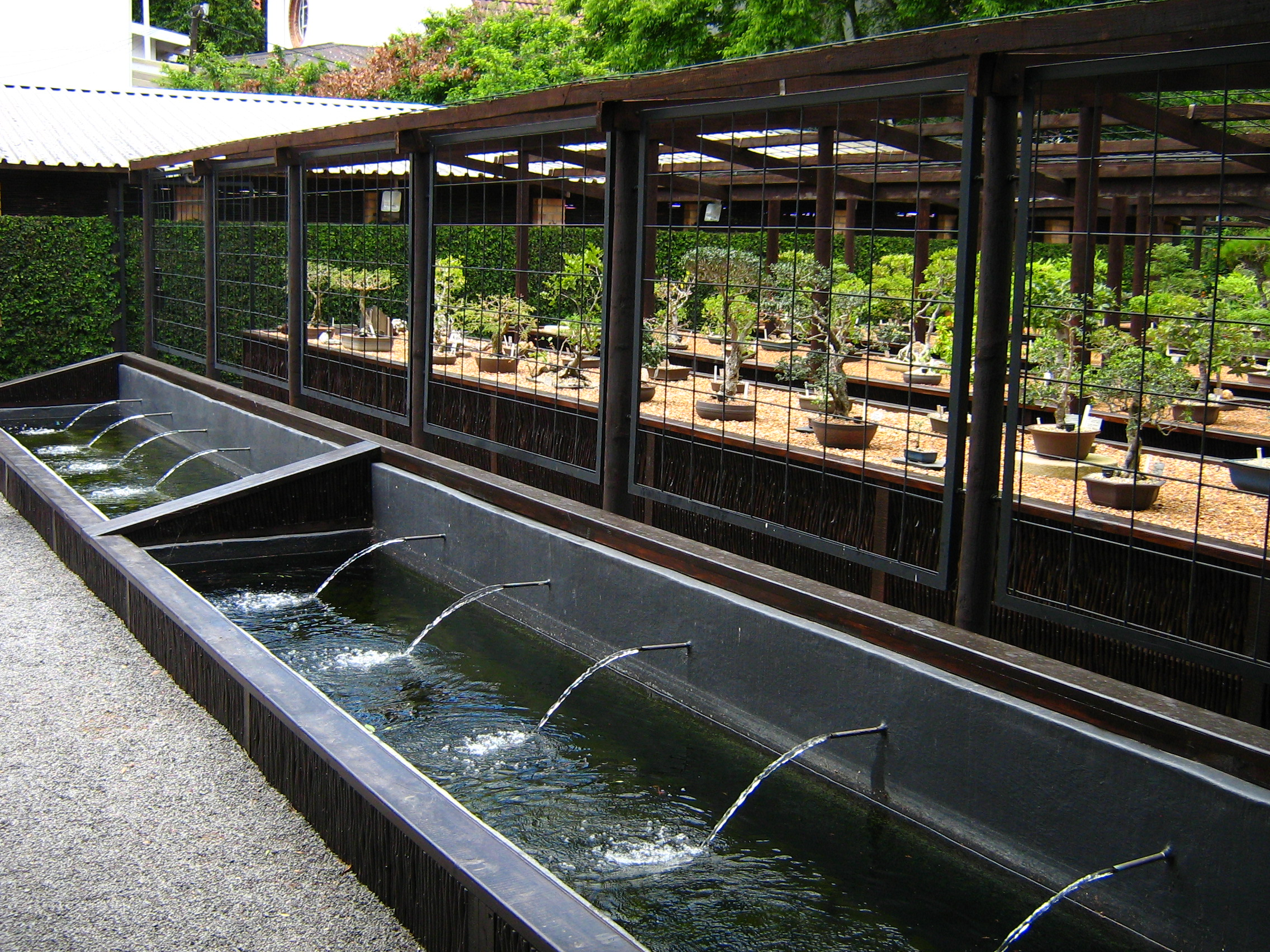
Western Cape Bonsai Heritage Collection at Stellenbosch University Botanical Garden

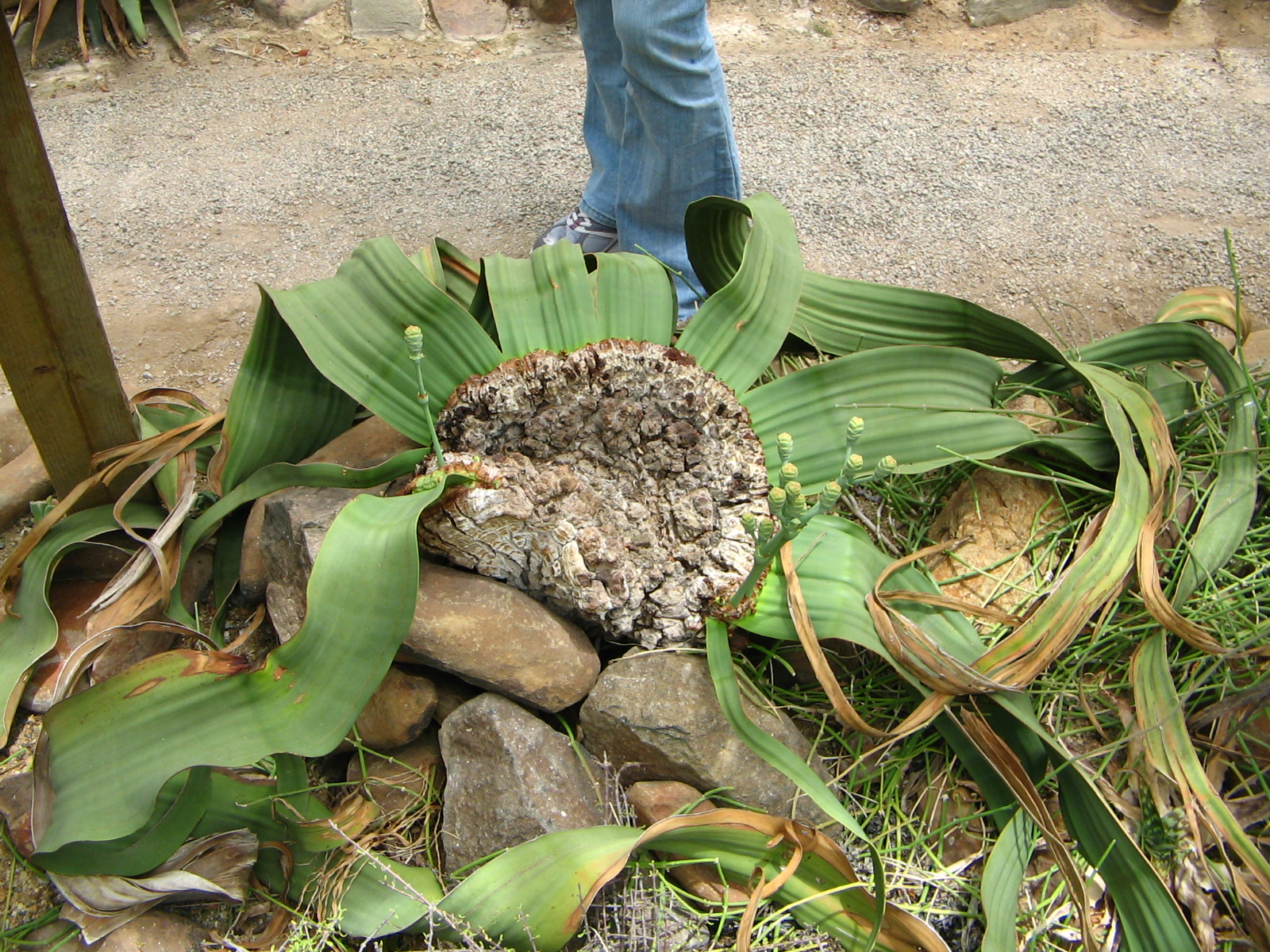
Welwitschia mirabilis, growing in one of the succulent greenhouses

Stellenbosch is located in a valley at an average elevation of 136m above sea-level. It has a Mediterranean climate with dry warm summers. Winters are cool and rainy. During spring and autumn daytime temperatures hover in the 20 °C's. This mild climate allows the garden to grow an incredible diversity of plant species. Various plants indigenous to the Cape Floral Kingdom and southern Africa, many of them rare, threatened or endangered species, can be found in the garden. Even some indigenous species now classified as extinct in the wild, such as Erica verticillata, can also be found in the garden. The garden also has various theme gardens and various specific plant collections.

=== Bonsai ===
The Western Cape Bonsai Heritage Collection is probably the biggest publicly accessible collection of bonsai in South Africa and features trees from well-known South African bonsai enthusiasts such as Becky Lucas, Gerjo van der Merwe and Louis Nel.

=== Ferns ===
A large collection of ferns can be found throughout the garden, especially in the two ferneries. Several species of ferns and tree ferns (especially the genus Cyathea) along with other closely related plants such as horsetails (Equisetum) are among the genera represented in the collection.

=== Insectivorous plants ===
Several insectivorous plant species are grown in the garden, including pitcher plants (Nepenthes and Sarracenia) and sundews (Drosera).

=== Medicinal plants ===
Medicinal plants and herbs from all over the world and southern Africa can be found in the garden. Some indigenous medicinal plants found in the collection include: boegoe (Agathosma), cancer bush (Lessertia frutescens), wild rosemary (Eriocephalus africanus), Pelargonium peltatum and Tetradenia riparia to name a few.

=== Oxalis ===
The collection was started in 2001 and has grown to currently include about 70% of southern African species. It acts as both a reference and research collection, and houses almost all specimens included in the species-level molecular phylogenetic reconstruction of southern African Oxalis.

=== Succulents and xerophytes ===
A wide variety of succulent and xerophytic plants from especially southern Africa and Madagascar can be found in the two arid houses and throughout the garden. Some interesting succulents and xerophytes on display include Welwitschia mirabilis, Aloidendron dichotomum (quiver tree), Xerosicyos danguyi (silver dollar vine), Dioscorea elephantipes (elephant's foot) and Pachypodium namaquanum (halfmens). Rare vygies such as Herreanthus meyeri (named after Hans Herre), Meyerophytum meyeri and Fenestraria aurantiaca are also on display.

=== Trees ===
Some interesting trees that can be found in the garden include Sequoiadendron giganteum (giant sequoia - the biggest tree species on earth), Metasequoia glyptostroboides (dawn redwood - thought to be extinct until 1948) and Sequoia sempervirens (Californian redwood - the tallest tree species on earth). Other trees of interest vary from olive trees (Olea europaea) grown from cuttings taken from the Garden of Gethsemane, to various trees indigenous to southern Africa such as Nuxia floribunda (forest elder), to subtropical trees such as Cinnamomum verum (cinnamon).

== Gallery ==
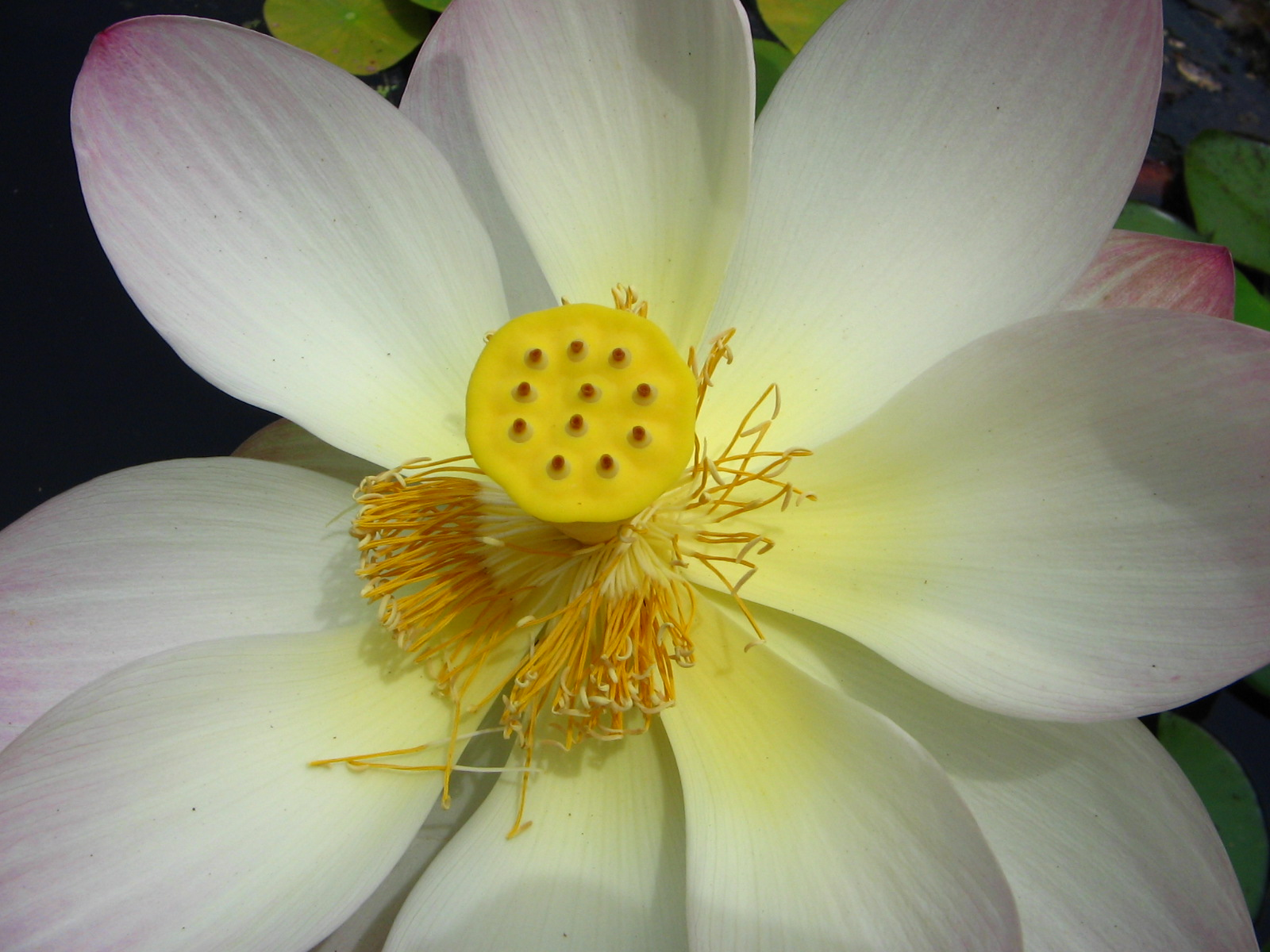
Lotus (Nelumbo)

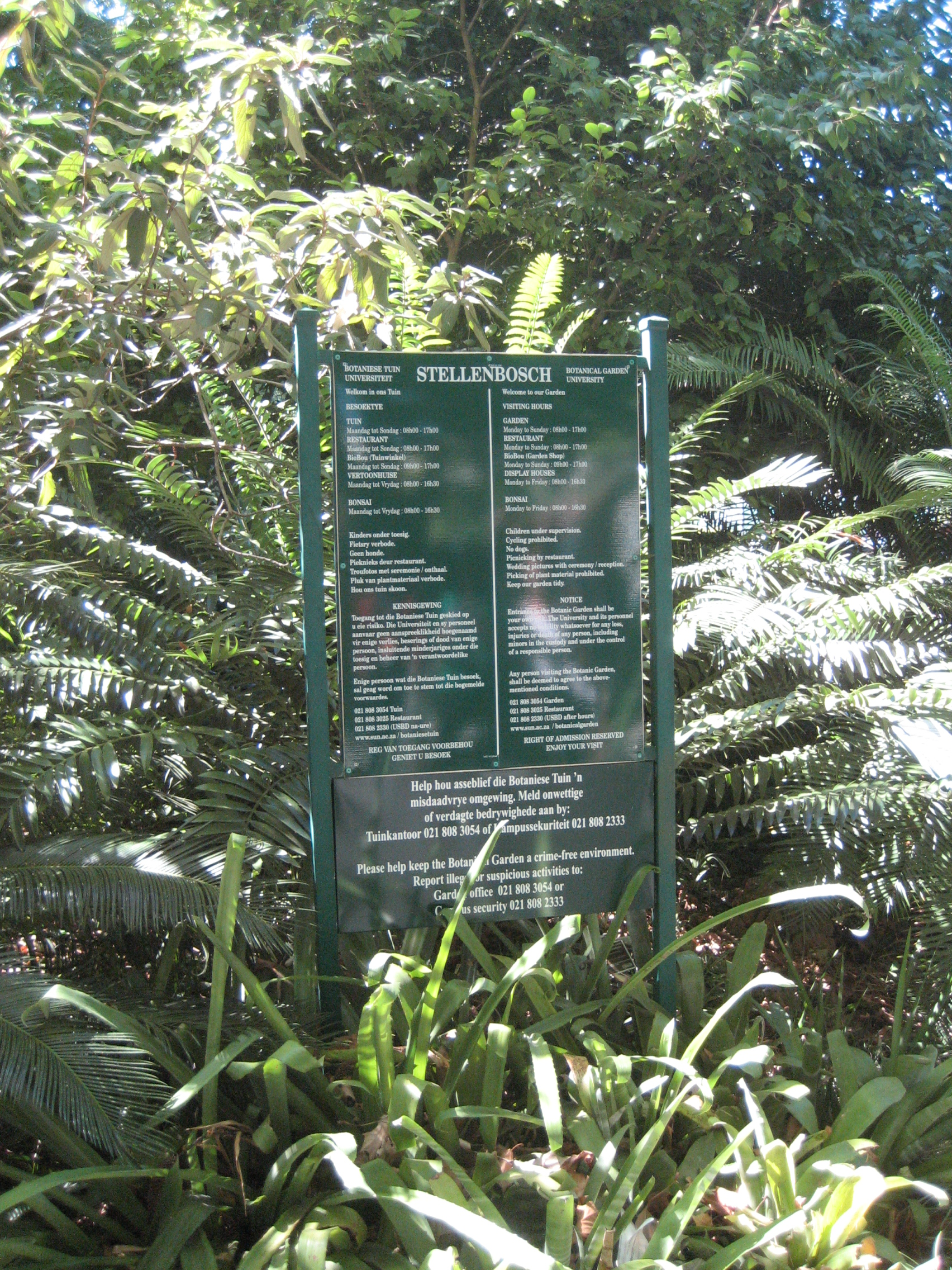
Entrance to the Botanical Garden

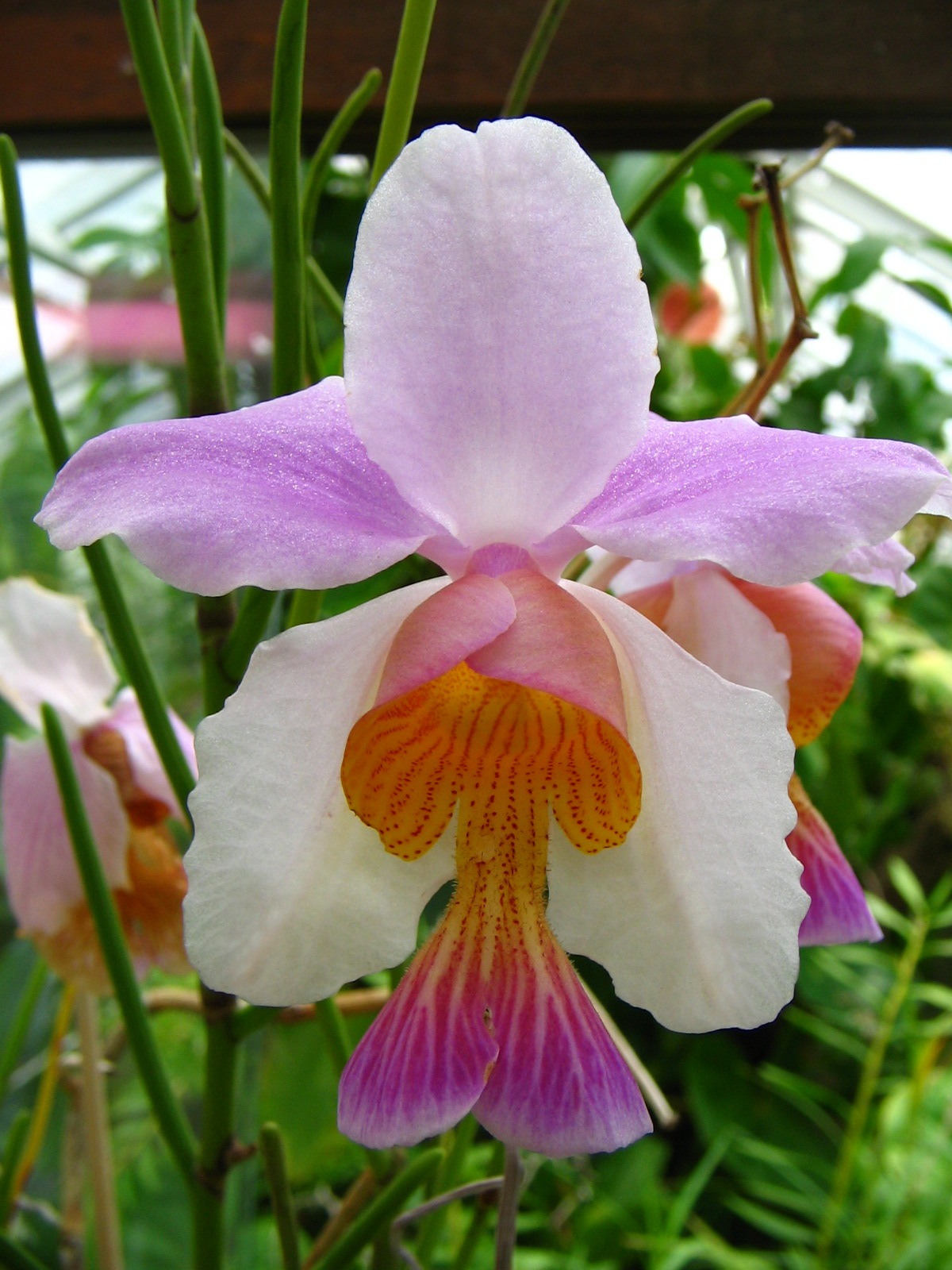
Vanda teres

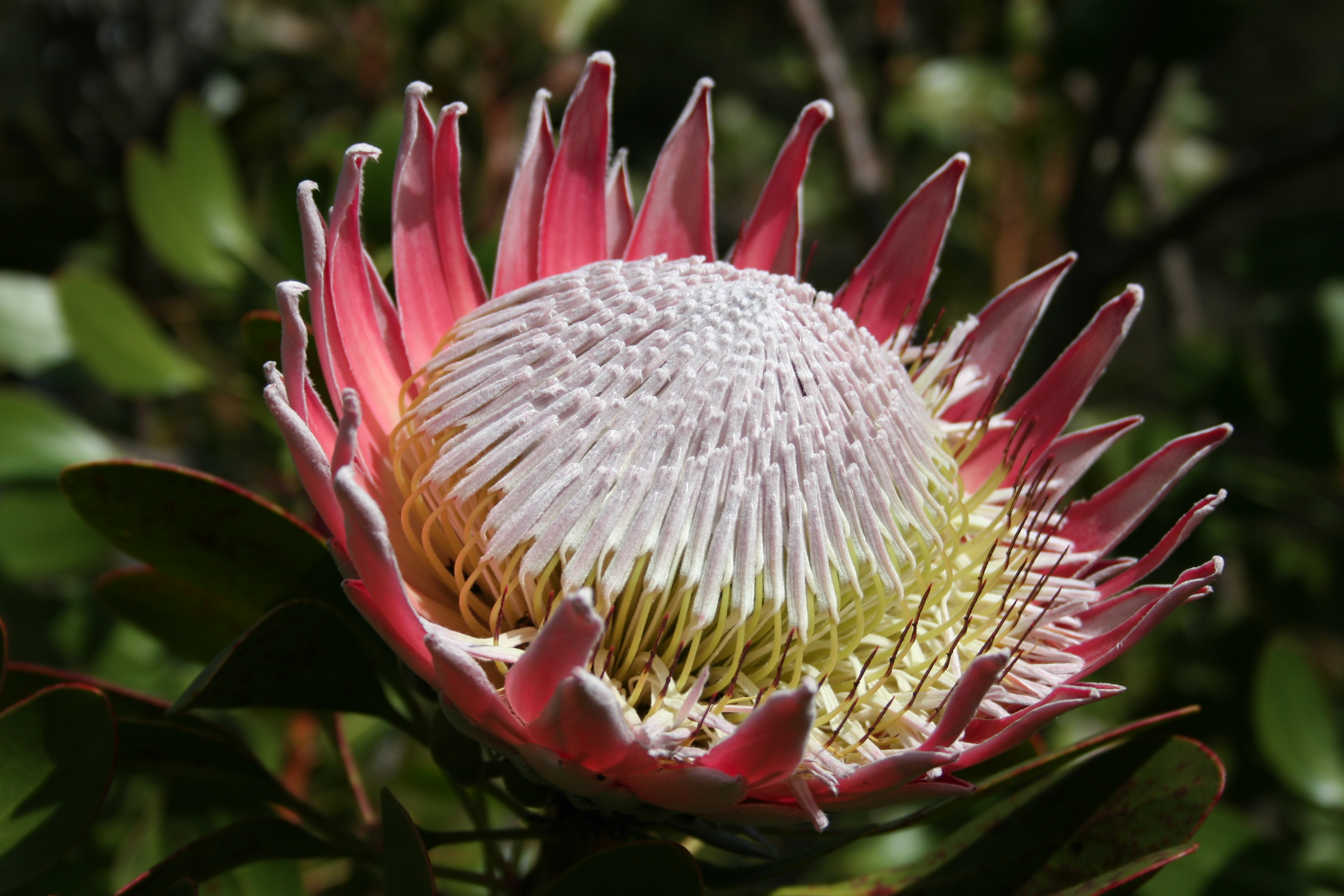
King Protea (Protea cynaroides)

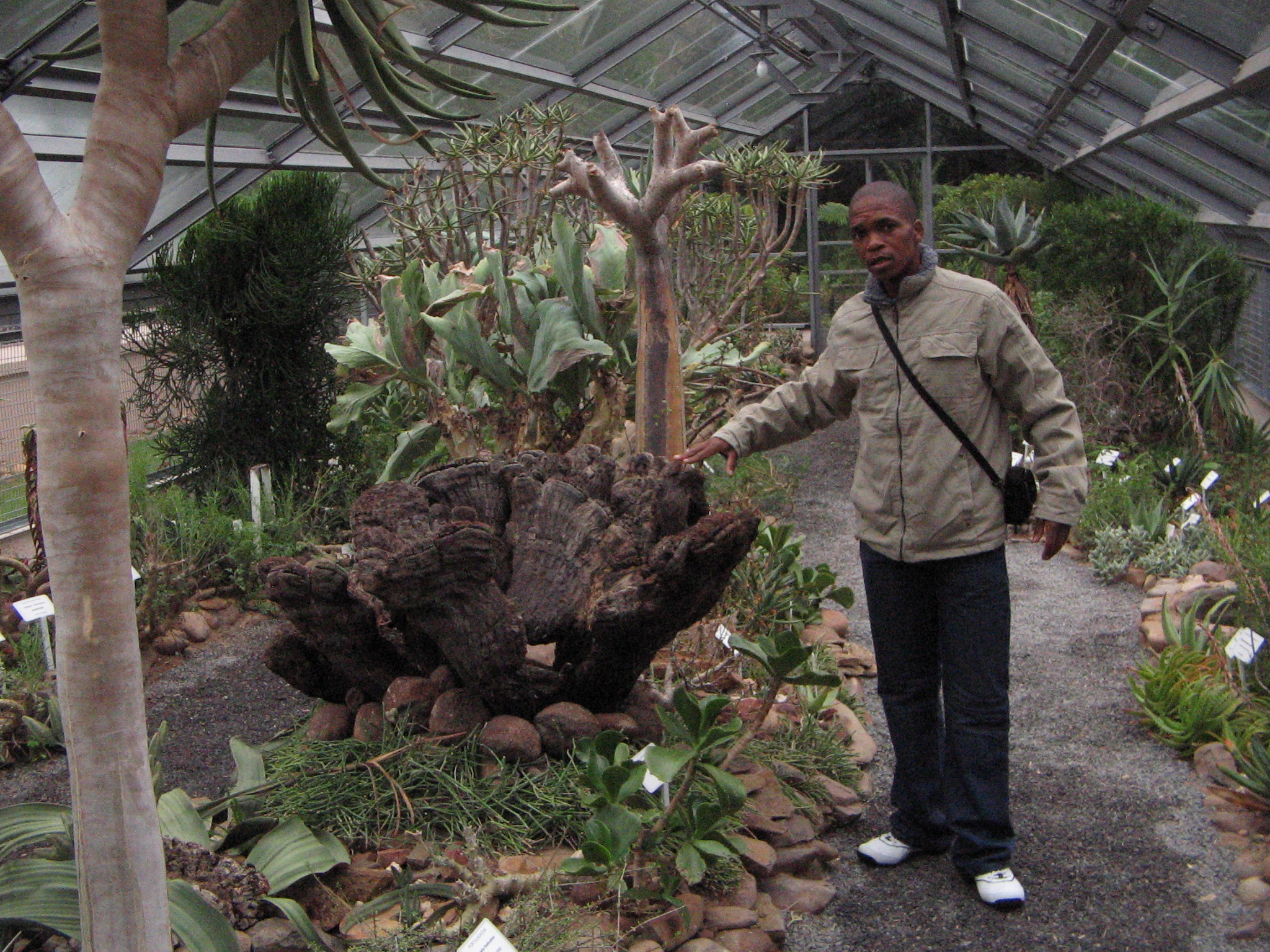
Succulent glasshouse

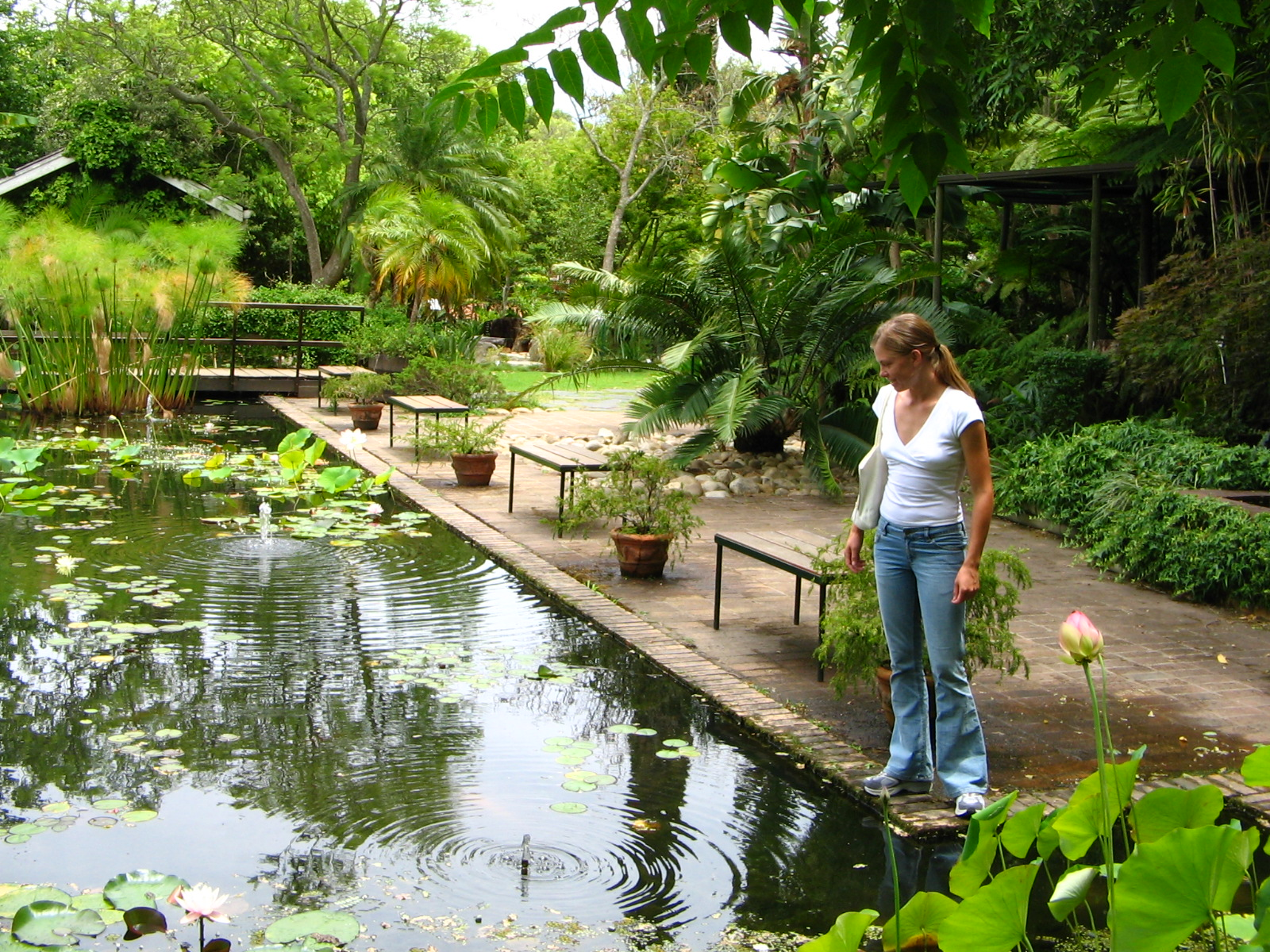
water-lily dams

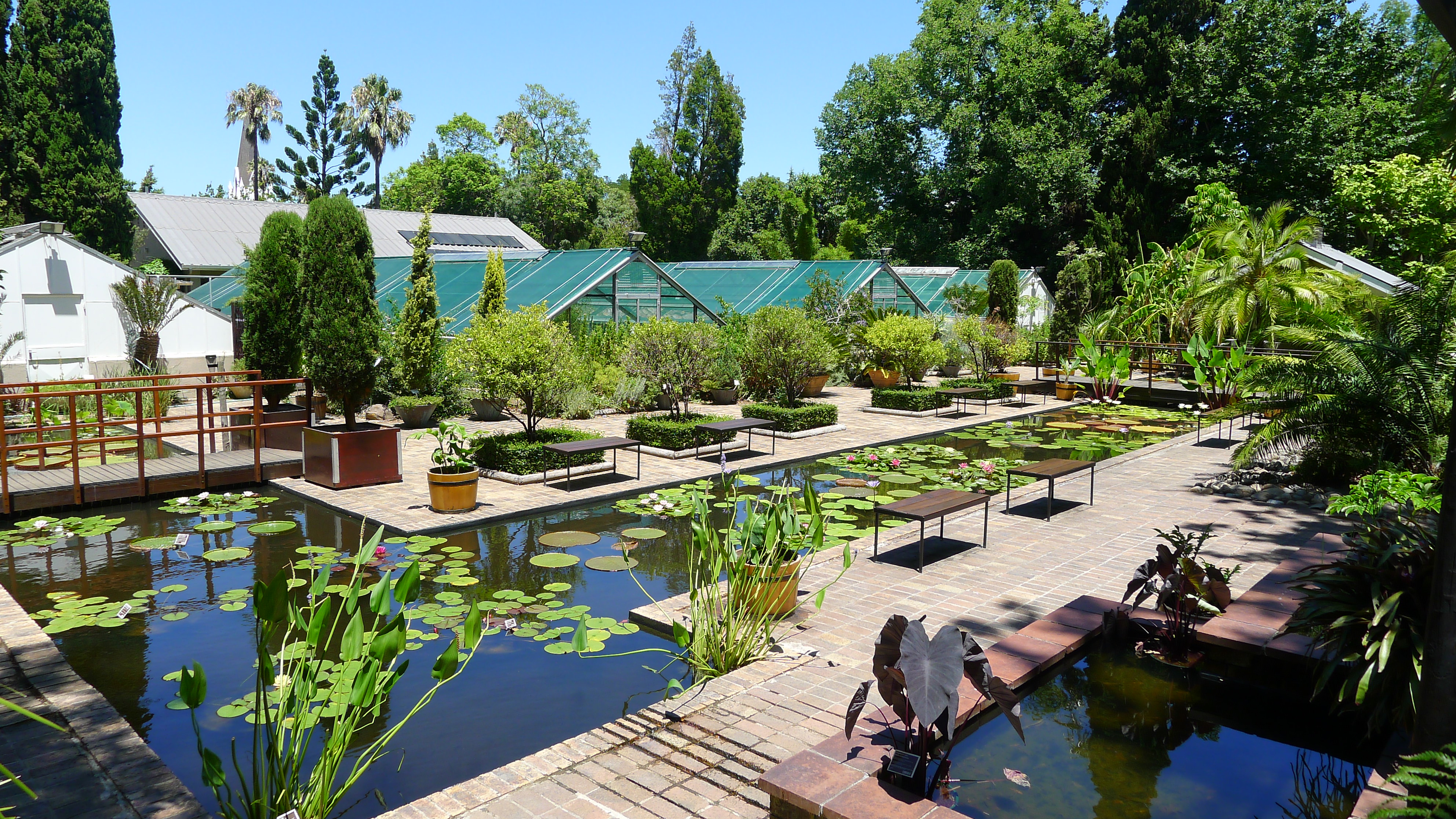
water-lily dams in 2014

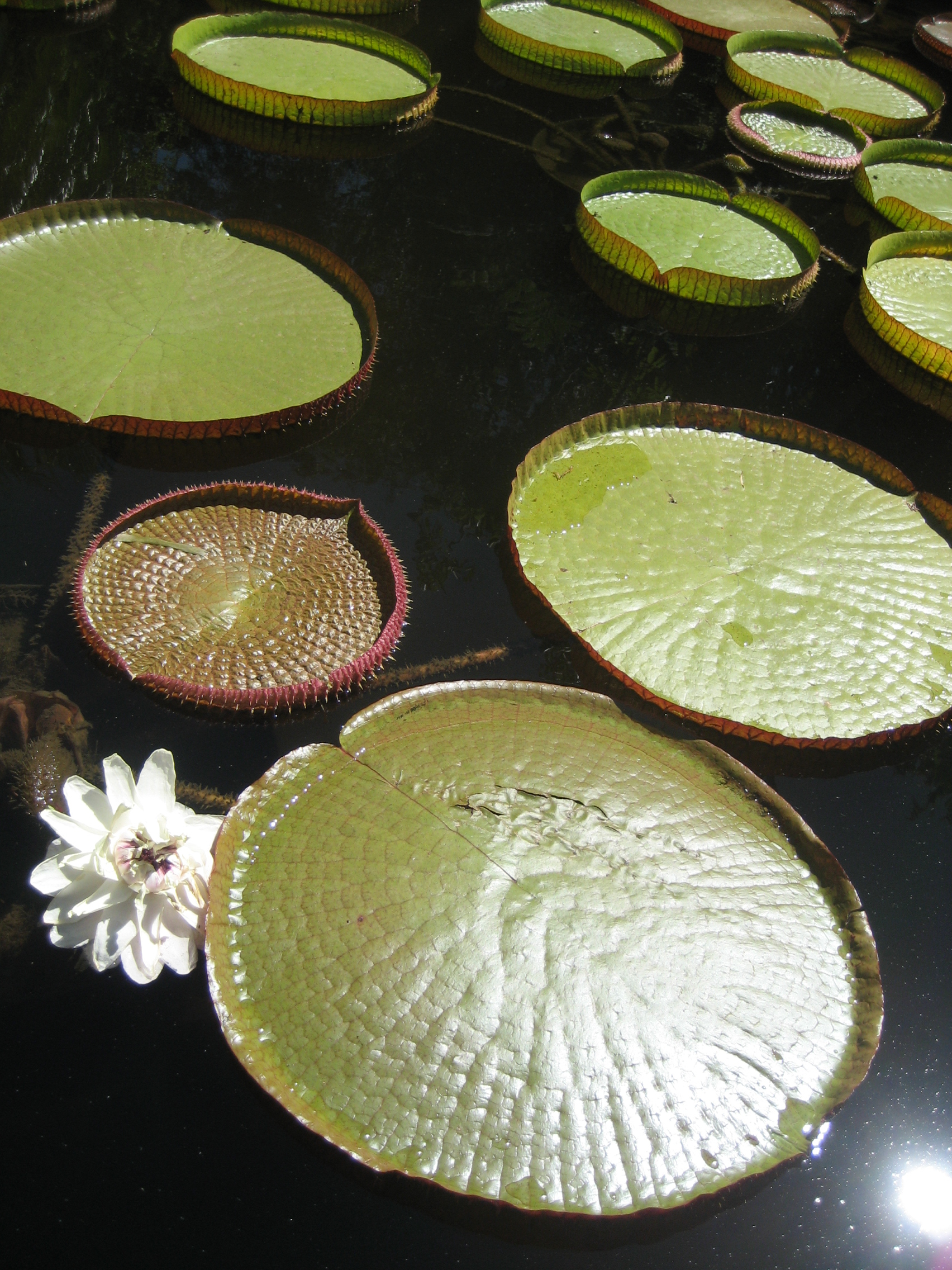
Victoria 'Longwood Hybrid'

== See also ==
- List of botanical gardens in South Africa
