= Garden Route Botanical Garden =

Botanical Garden in George, Western Cape

Coordinates: 33°56′50″S 22°27′48″E

The Garden Route Botanical Garden located in George, Western Cape and borders the Outeniqua Nature Reserve. The Garden focuses on plants native to the Southern Cape region. It also houses the South Cape Herbarium, an Indigenous Nursery, the Getafix Garden Cafe, and the Garden Route Environmental Education Centre. The GRBG is run by a private trust the GRBG Trust – a registered environmental NGO with PBO status.

It includes a nursery, an herbarium, the Moriarty Environmental Centre, and hiking trails. Waterfowl nest in the two dams left from the town's original water supply system. A bust of William John Burchell commemorates his visit to the newly founded town in 1811. In the past, the garden was known as the Van Kervel Nature Garden.

== See also ==
- List of botanical gardens in South Africa
