= Makana Botanical Gardens =

Botanical gardens in Grahamstown, South Africa

Coordinates: 33.3156°S 26.5209°E

- Location: Rhodes University, Makhanda (Grahamstown), South Africa
- Area: 60 hectares (150 acres)
- Established: 1853; 173 years ago
- Operator: Rhodes University
- Makana Botanical Gardens (Eastern Cape)

The Makana Botanical Gardens is a botanical garden in South Africa operated by Rhodes University, located in Grahamstown.

The garden is on Gunfire Hill and is surrounded by the 1820 Settlers National Monument, Fort Selwyn, the Albany Museum, and Grey Dam Lake. The garden's 60 hectares (150 acres) have been planted with both native species and transplants for a long time, especially aloes, sycamores, and succulent varieties. One section was modelled after a typical English landscape garden, but has since fallen to neglect.

Each October from 2009 to 2013, a flower festival was held here. In 2014 the festival was moved to the 1820 Settlers' Monument for a November festival, due to fickle weather and late-blooming spring flowers.

== History ==
The gardens were established in 1853 and was the second botanical garden to be founded in the Cape Colony. A prospectus was compiled for the establishment of the gardens in 1846, but the establishment was delayed by the Frontier Wars. Sir Harry Smith, 1st Baronet and Sir George Cathcart were both present at the formal opening. The grounds are allegedly haunted by Smith's wife, Juana. The gardens were declared a national monument on 4 July 1994.

== See also ==
- List of botanical gardens in South Africa
- South African National Parks
