= KwaZulu-Natal National Botanical Garden =

Botanical garden in Pietermaritzburg, South Africa

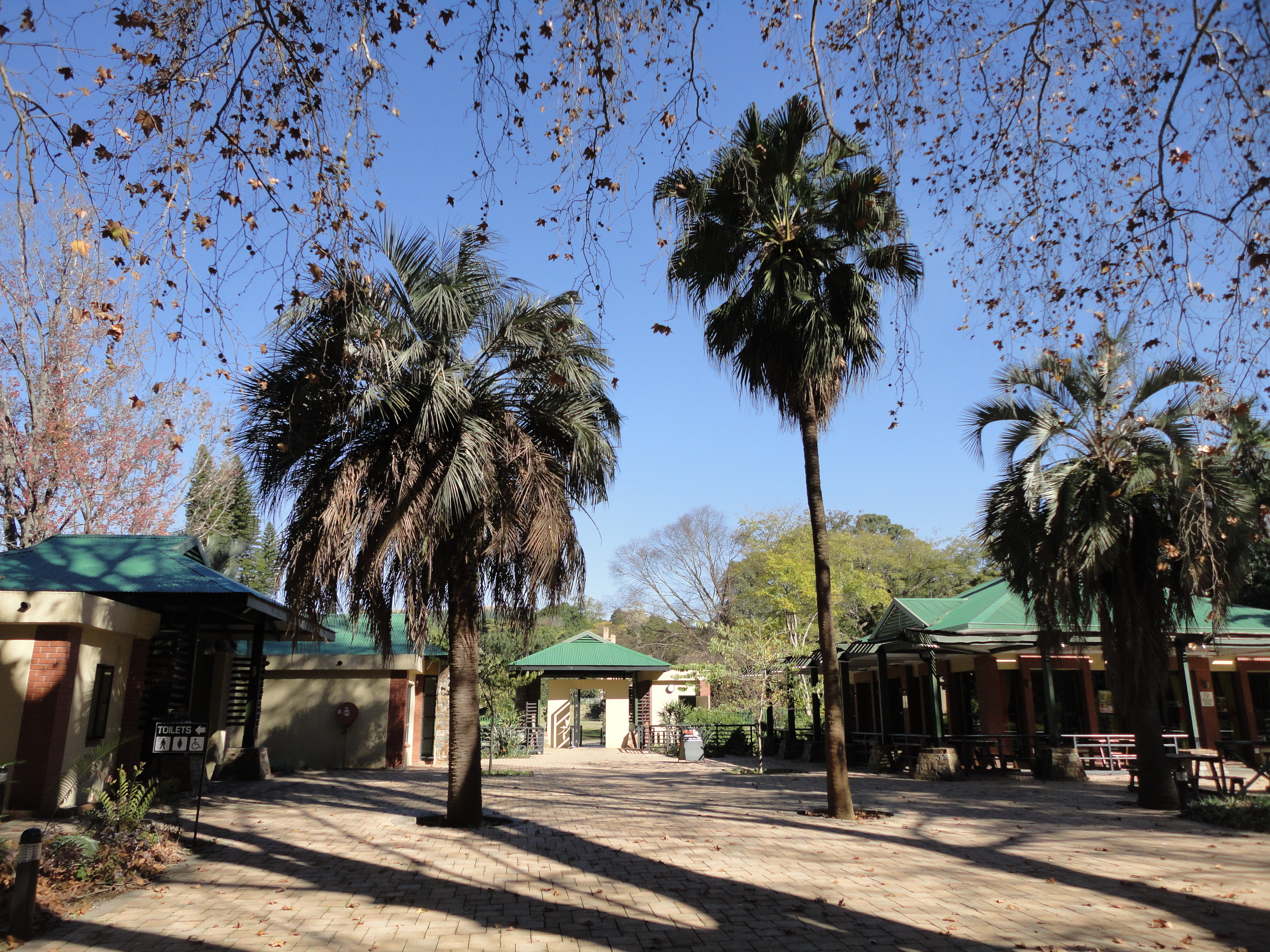
- Reception area of the garden
- Interactive map of KwaZulu-Natal National Botanical Garden
- Type: park, botanical garden.
- Location: Pietermaritzburg, South Africa
- Coordinates: 29°36′28″S 30°20′48″E
- Area: circa 52 hectares (130 acres)
- Created: 1874
- Open: Yes

The KwaZulu-Natal National Botanical Garden is situated along Mayor's Walk, in the western suburbs of Pietermaritzburg, South Africa. The identification code of the KwaZulu-Natal National Botanical Garden as a member of the Botanic Gardens Conservation International (BGCI), as well as the initials of its herbarium is NBGN.

== History ==
KwaZulu-Natal National Botanical Garden was established in 1874. Plants from eastern South Africa and from the Northern Hemisphere are cultivated here. The garden is open every day of the year, from 8 a.m. to 6 p.m. in the summer, and from 8 a.m. to 5.30 p.m. in the winter.

It features a century-old lane of plane trees, leading northwards from the entrance, and a forested hillside featuring footpaths. The Dorpspruit, a tributary of the Msunduze River, flows at the base of the hillside.

The garden is one of the oldest in the world, and in 2015, a plan was announced that gave the garden an upgrade and a new lease on life.

== See also ==
- List of botanical gardens in South Africa
