= Thohoyandou National Botanical Garden =

National botanical garden in Limpopo, South Africa

- Interactive map of Thohoyandou National Botanical Garden
- Type: Botanical garden
- Coordinates: 22°57′45″S 30°27′54″E
- Area: 83.05 ha (205.2 acres)
- Designated: 5 November 2021; 4 years ago
- Administrator: South African National Biodiversity Institute
- Website: Thohoyandou - SANBI
- Thohoyandou National Botanical Garden (Limpopo)

The Thohoyandou National Botanical Garden is located in the north-east of Limpopo province, South Africa. The garden is the 11th national botanical garden and principally hosts endemic plants from the Soutpansberg region.

== History ==
In 1986, the Venda government established the garden. In 2017, it was transferred to SANBI, and made a national botanical garden in 2021.

== Biodiversity ==
=== Vegetation ===
An endemic forest consisting of Acacia and Ficus dominates the hilly Soutpansberg landscape.

=== Birds ===
The garden hosts a number of species of birds:

- African wood owl
- Pink-throated twinspot
- Bar-throated apalis
- Bearded scrub-robin
- Black sparrowhawk
- Blue-spotted wood dove
- Gorgeous bushshrike
- Green-backed twinspot
- Narina trogon
- Red-capped robin-chat
