= Manie van der Schijff Botanical Garden =

Botanical garden in Pretoria, South Africa

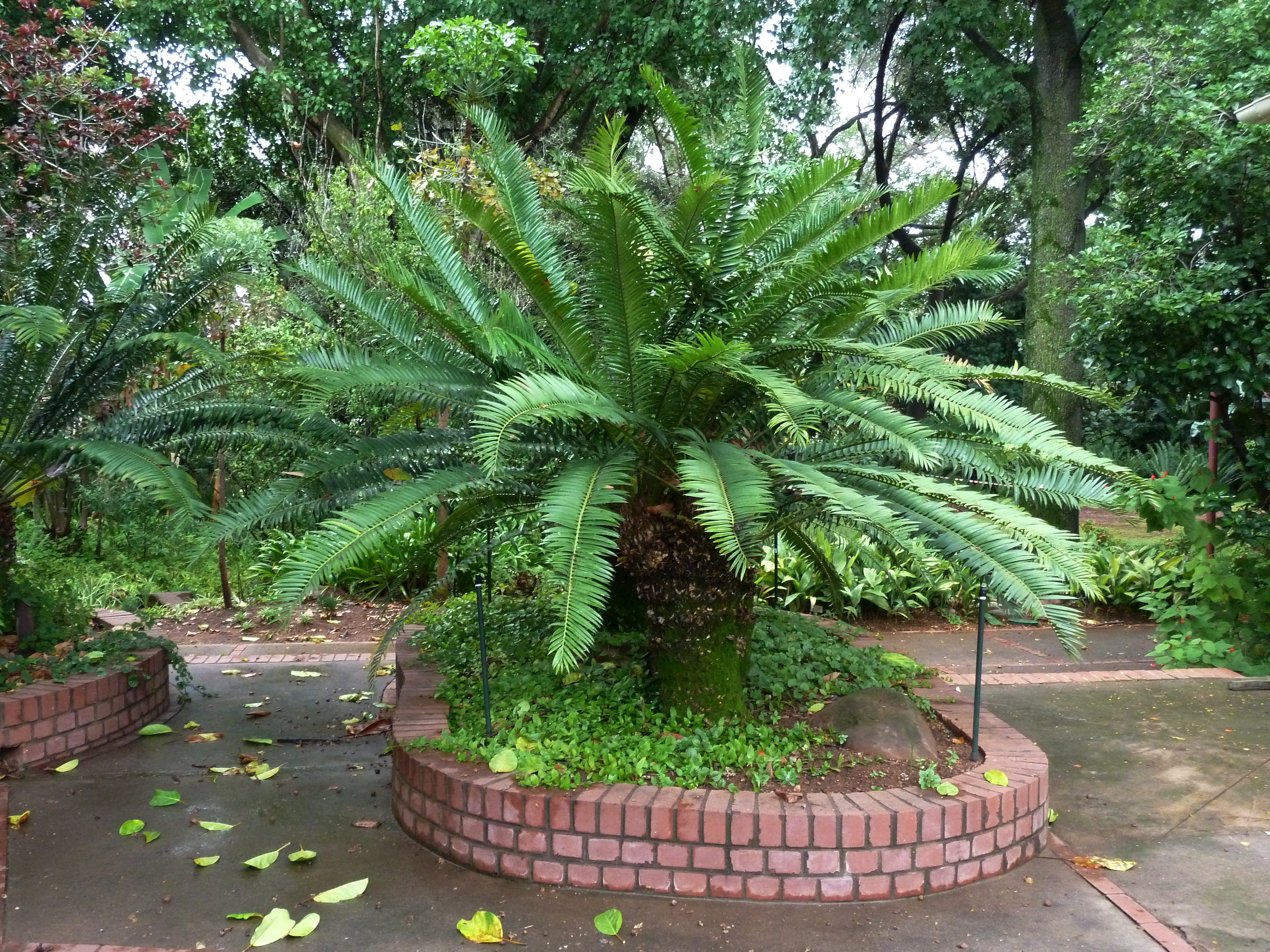
- Jozini cycads in the garden

- Location within South Africa
- Type: Botanical garden
- Location: Pretoria, South Africa
- Coordinates: 25°45′07″S 28°13′44″E
- Area: 3.5 hectares (8.6 acres)
- Opened: 1934
- Operator: University of Pretoria
- Status: Open

The Manie van der Schijff Botanical Garden was formally established in 1934 and is managed by the University of Pretoria. Although the garden was originally established to support research and the conservation of indigenous plants, the garden is open to the public.

== History ==
The garden had its beginnings in 1924 when the first Pavetta species were planted on the campus for research purposes, and the first cycads were added to the botanical collections of the university. In the 1930s however, Berend Elbrecht's enthusiasm and passion for southern African flora gave the impetus for the planting of a number of tree and cycad species during his tenure. In 1986, the contributions of Prof. Manie van der Schijff was honoured when the garden was named after him.

== Activities and layout ==
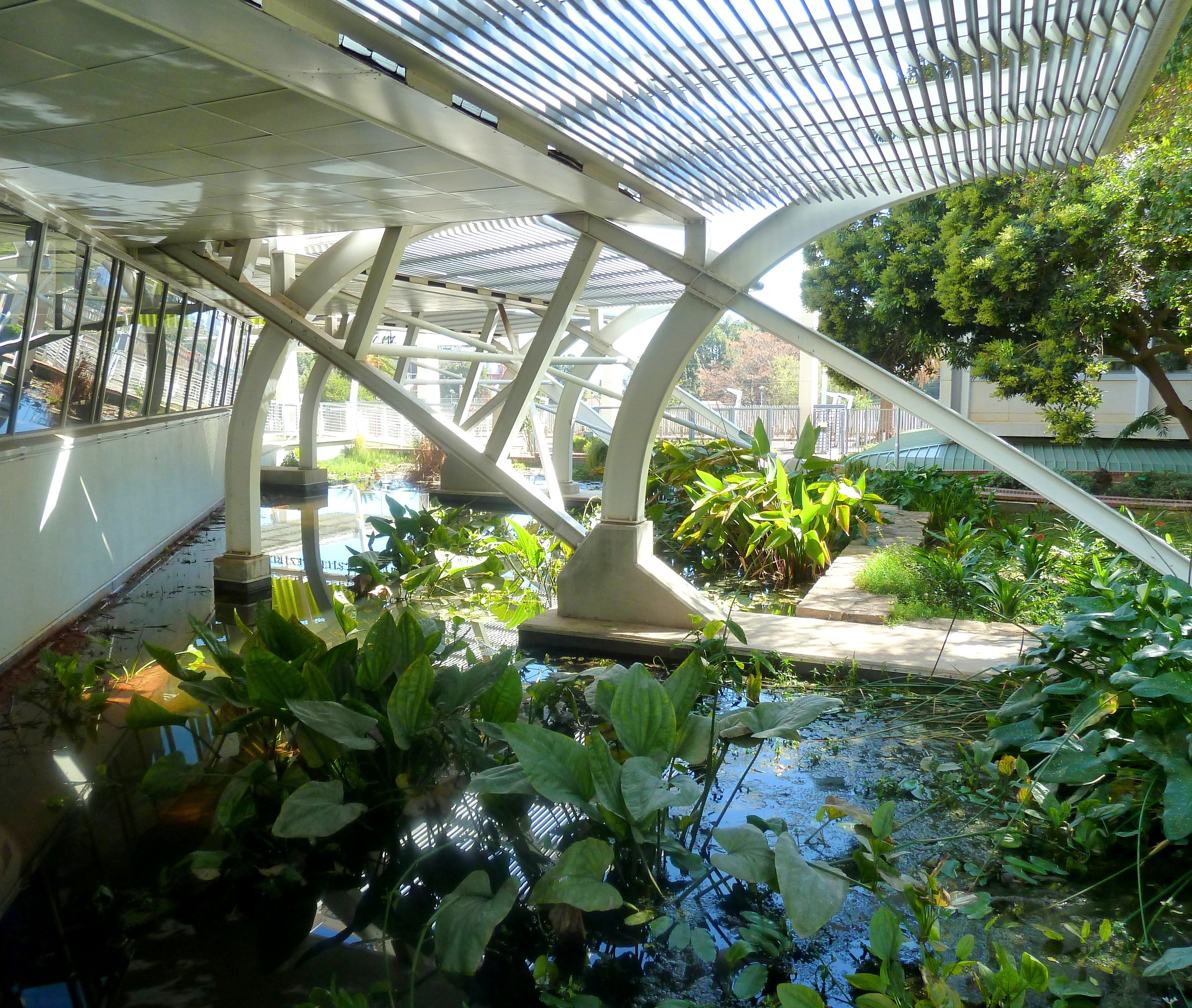
The rainwater harvesting garden was installed over 2012/13

The content and activities of the garden are formulated and implemented by committee. About 3,000 plant species are present on about 3.5 ha of the west campus.

The garden houses the bulk of the university's cycad collection, managed by its own curator, and is involved in active horticultural research with such new installations as the rainwater harvesting garden and the cremnophyte based green walls of the new Plant Science building. Both of these projects mimic natural systems so as to create habitat for specialized plant species.

Aims of the garden include awareness of southern African flora through dissemination and acquisition of botanical knowledge, provision of plant material for education and research, collection and propagation of rare species, as well as research into southern African plants with horticultural potential.

== See also ==
- List of botanical gardens in South Africa
