= University of KwaZulu-Natal Botanical Garden =

Botanical garden in Pietermaritzburg, KwaZulu-Natal

Coordinates: 29°37′30″S 30°24′14″E

The University of KwaZulu-Natal Botanical Garden in Pietermaritzburg, KwaZulu-Natal was established in 1983. Although the Garden was established to support research and conservation of indigenous plants, the Garden is open to the public.

== See also ==
- List of botanical gardens in South Africa
