= North-West University Botanical Garden =

Botanical Garden on the Potchefstroom Campus of the North-West University

Coordinates: 26°40′55.01″S 27°05′43.19″E

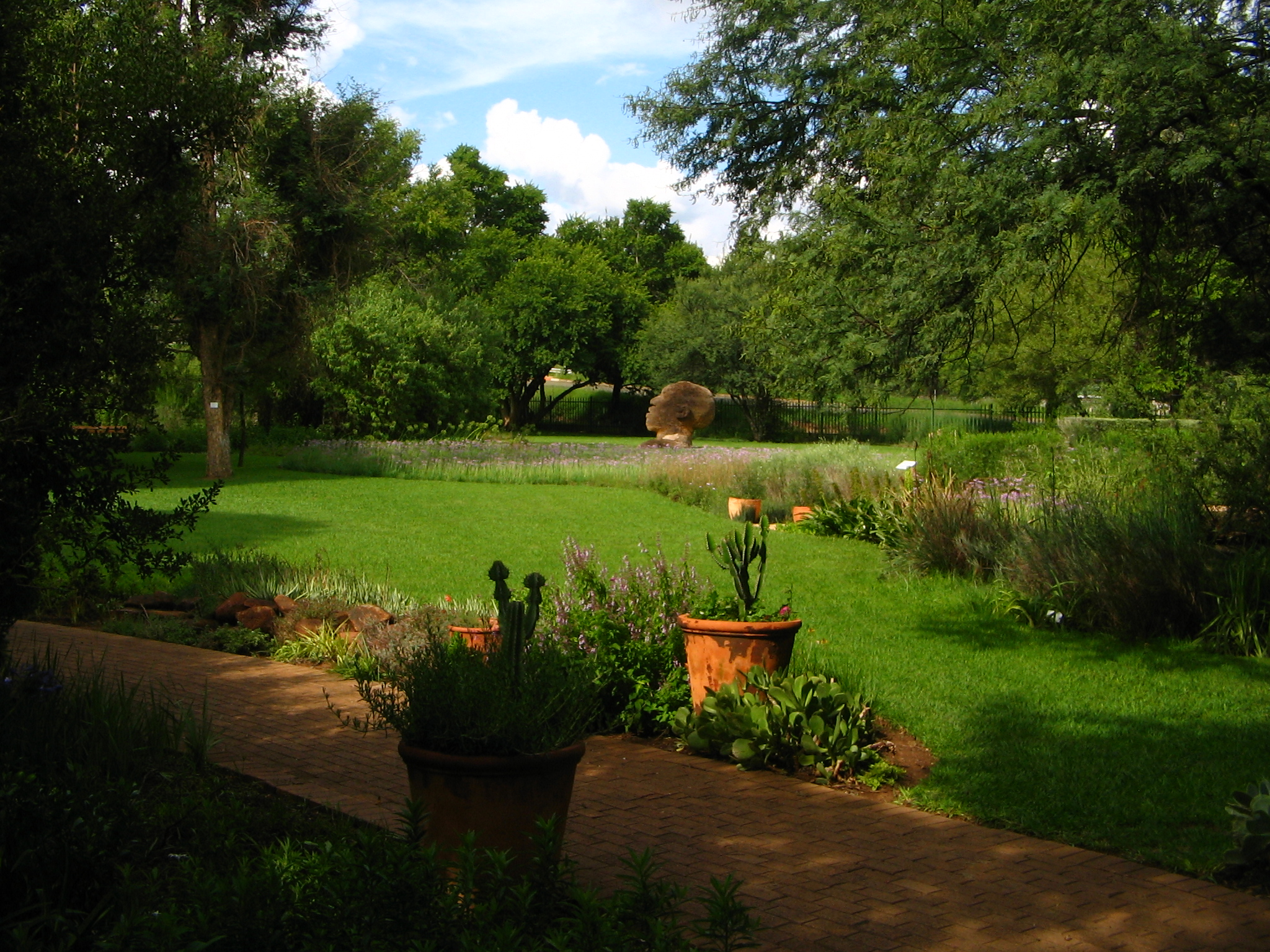
The North-West University Botanical Garden, view towards thatch sculpture

The North-West University Botanical Garden on the Potchefstroom Campus of the North-West University (NWU) is the only botanical garden in the North West Province of South Africa. The Garden spans just under three hectares and is open to the public.

== History ==
The history of the North-West University Botanical Garden dates back to 1962 when dr. Wynand Louw, a botany lecturer, requested land from the then Potchefstroom University for Christian Higher Education for the establishment of a garden to grow plant material needed for formal practical laboratory sessions in botany. The garden was referred to as the Veld Garden during this initial period. The impetus to develop a proper botanical garden did however not start until 1971 with the arrival of professor Daan Botha, a plant systematics lecturer. Curation of the Garden started in 1973 when Bert Ubbink was appointed as curator. He was responsible for the initial design of the garden and also oversaw the layout of pathways, the construction of the office building, ponds as well as the rocky ridge and waterfall. The plant collections of the Botanical Garden also quickly expanded and two greenhouses were built to house the frost tender succulents and xerophytes as well as tropical and subtropical plants. In 1982 the Botanical Garden was officially opened to the public. Past curators include Bert Ubbink (1973-2003), Peter Mortimer (2003-2007), Martin Smit (2007-2011) and Chris van Niekerk (2012- ).

== Key functions and activities ==
The North-West University Botanical Garden fulfills many key functions within the North-West University most notably supporting the training of students and research. Even though horticulture is not taught at the North-West University, an internship program funded by AgriSETA was started in 2011 to give young horticulturalists a chance to gain valuable practical experience. Besides the academic functions the Botanical Garden is also involved with conservation efforts of numerous threatened indigenous plant species particularly threatened species endemic to the North West Province of South Africa. In 2008 the Botanical Garden signed up to the International Agenda for Botanic Gardens in Conservation that commits the Garden to contribute to the 16 conservation targets set out in the Global Strategy for Plant Conservation (GSPC). The Garden has made many contributions towards species conservation most notably in 2011 when the Garden donated seeds of a newly discovered and already threatened monotypic species, Prototulbaghia siebertii, to the Millennium Seed Bank Project.

The Garden also provides may educational opportunities to visitors and the local community. Visitor friendly plant labels, emphasizing common plant names and plant uses, are used throughout the Garden. The Garden also regularly supports community projects such as creation of school and community gardens. In 2008 a partnerships was established with the North-West University Science Centre to also give local school groups exposure to the biological sciences during the annual National Science Week by providing suitable programming in the Botanical Garden.

In 2008 an old hall in the office building, that once housed the A.P. Goossens Herbarium, was converted into a multipurpose space and has since then been used by the North-West University Gallery for various art exhibitions and also as a classroom for visiting school groups. Art exhibitions are held in the Gallery and Botanical Garden year round. The Garden also serves as an official venue for the Aardklop National Arts Festival since 2008.

== Plant collection ==
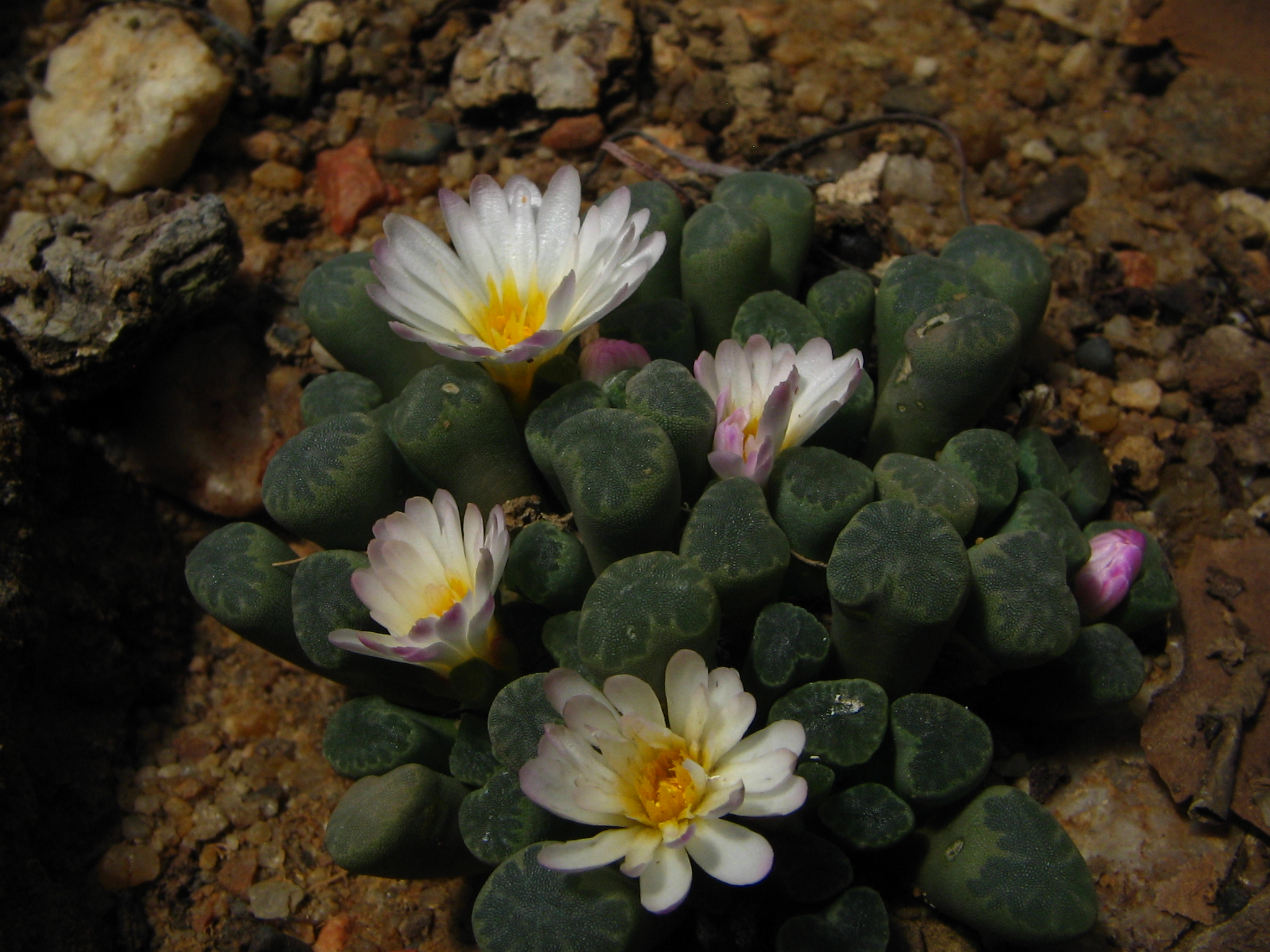
Frithia humilis grown for research and conservation purposes in the North-West University Botanical Garden

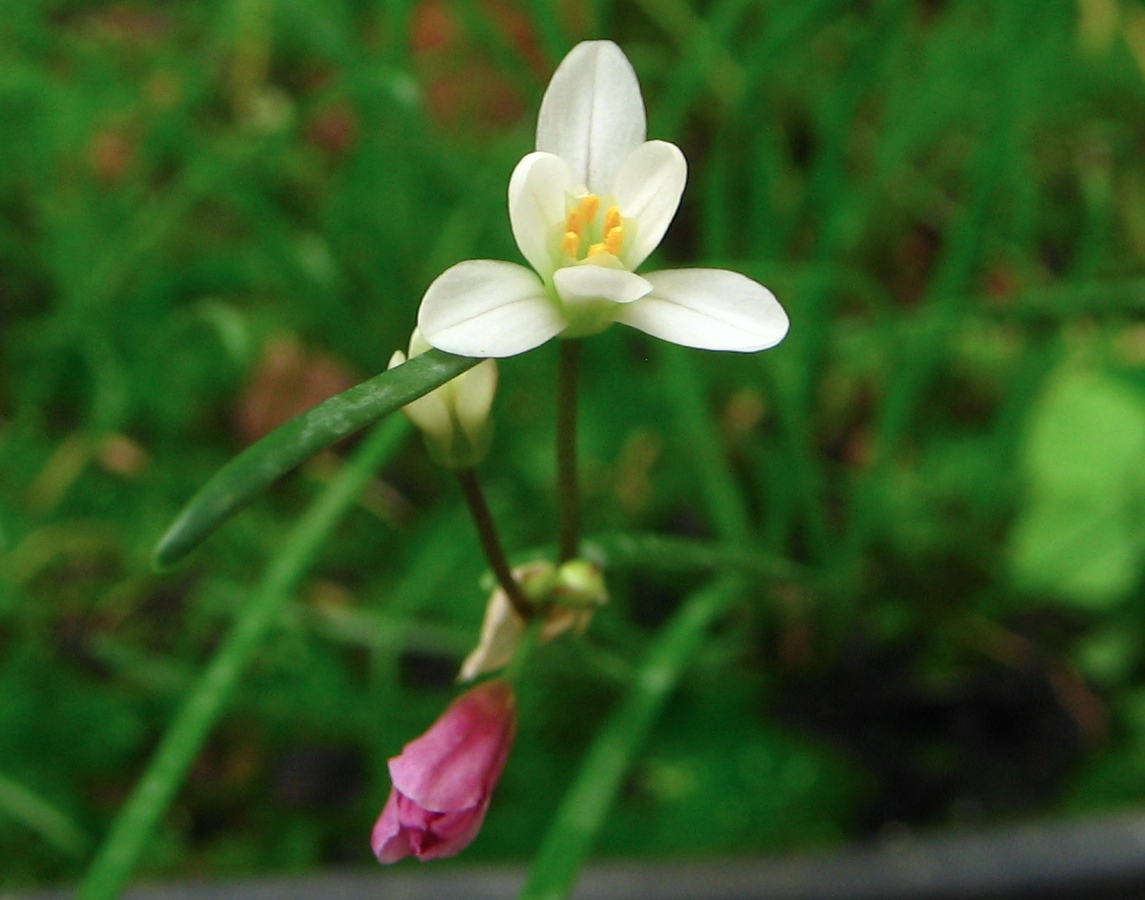
Prototulbaghia siebertii grown for conservation and research, flourishing in the North-West University Botanical Garden

The North-West University Botanical Garden is located in Potchefstroom, in the Highveld region of South Africa. This region is characterized by cold dry winters with frequent frost and hot summers with regular thundershowers. Temperatures as low as minus 10 °C have been recorded in the Botanical Garden during winter.

=== Garden and theme gardens ===
Even though the North-West University Botanical Garden spans less than three hectares more than a 1500 plant species is found here. Most plants in the Botanical Garden are indigenous to South Africa with the exception of a few exotic plants which are kept for research or educational value. A large section of the garden, around a man-made ridge, is managed as a natural wooded grassland area. A variety of theme gardens make up the rest of the Botanical Garden, including the swamp garden, vlei garden, contemporary indigenous garden, vegetable and herb garden, invader display, plant evolution garden and succulent rockery. Some more common plant genera represented in the garden include Acacia, Aloe, Bonatea, Crinum, Dierama, Encephalartos, Eucomis, Eulophia, Euphorbia, Gasteria, Gladiolus, Haworthia, Hypoxis, Indigofera, Kniphofia, Plectranthus, Podocarpus, Polygala, Scadoxus, Searsia, Stapelia and Zantedeschia.

=== Tropical greenhouse ===
In the tropical greenhouse a variety of tropical and subtropical plants from all over the world are present. Some of the plants include a variety of food and medicinal plants including Coffea arabica (coffee), Camellia sinensis (tea), Vanilla planifolia (vanilla), Saccharum officinarum (sugarcane), Cinnamomum zeylanicum (cinnamon), Oryza sativa (rice), Theobroma cacao (cacao), Siphonochilus aethiopicus (wild ginger), Warburghia salutaris (pepper bark tree) and Piper nigrum (pepper). The tropical greenhouse also houses many other exotic plants from a variety of families, most notably the orchid family. Many indigenous epiphytic orchids such as Ansellia africana (leopard orchid) and Mystacidium capense, are grown there. Other interesting plants on display include Amorphophallus titanum (giant corpse flower), Hydnophytum formicarum (ant plant), Heliconia humilis (lobster plant), Nepenthes alata (pitcher plant) and Ravenala madagascariensis (travelers palm). In 2010 Victoria cruziana (giant Amazon waterlily) was also successfully grown in the tropical greenhouse which drew numerous curious visitors to the Garden. This was the first successful recorded cultivation in many decades for South Africa.

=== Succulent greenhouse ===
In the succulent greenhouse a variety of succulents and other xerophytes are displayed, with most species indigenous to Southern Africa and Madagascar. Some of the interesting plants on display include Myrothamnus flabellifolius (resurrection plant), Didierea madagascariensis (octopus tree), Adansonia digitata (baobab), Fockea edulis (kambro), Hoodia gordonii (ghaap), Aloidendron dichotomum (quiver tree), Sceletium tortuosum (kougoed), Welwitschia mirabilis, Frithia humilis (fairy elephant's feet) and Euphorbia louwii (named after dr. Wynand Louw). Some locally threatened plants such as Nananthus vittatus, (bushveld vygie), Aloe peglerae (red hot poker aloe), Euphorbia knobelii, Euphorbia perangusta and Lithops lesliei (living stones) are also on display.

== Gallery ==
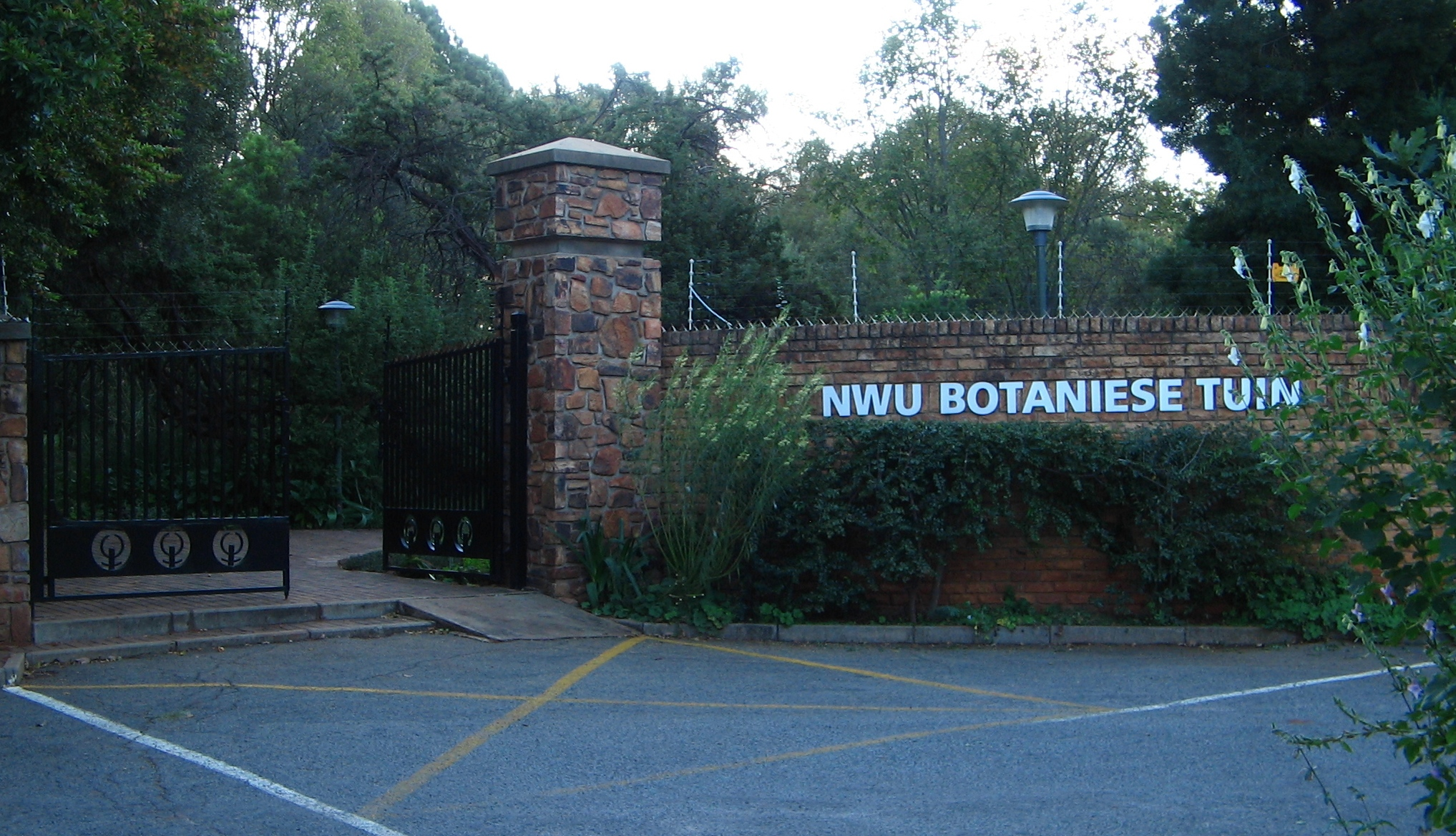
North-West University Botanical Garden entrance

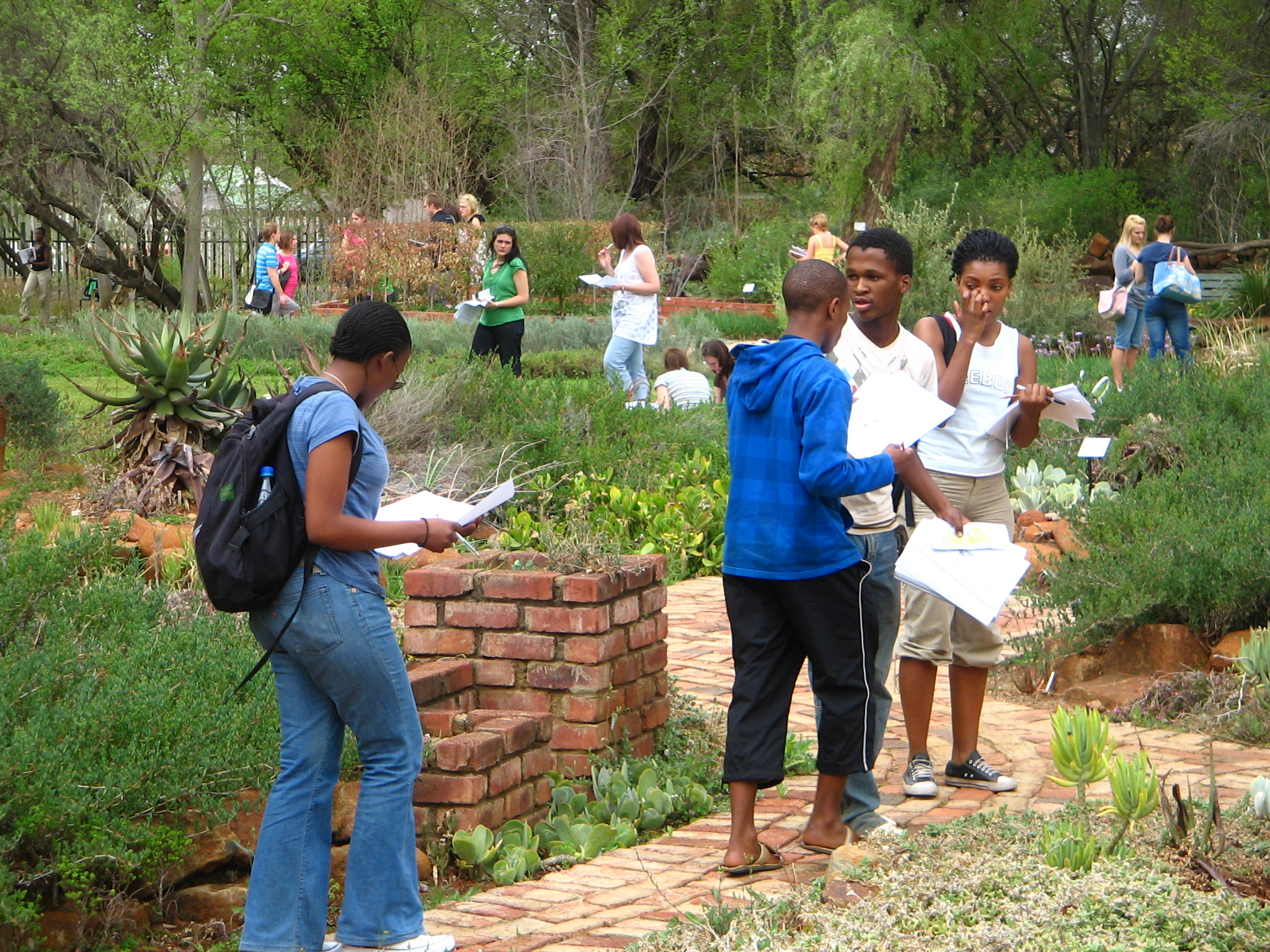
Students completing practical assignments in the Garden

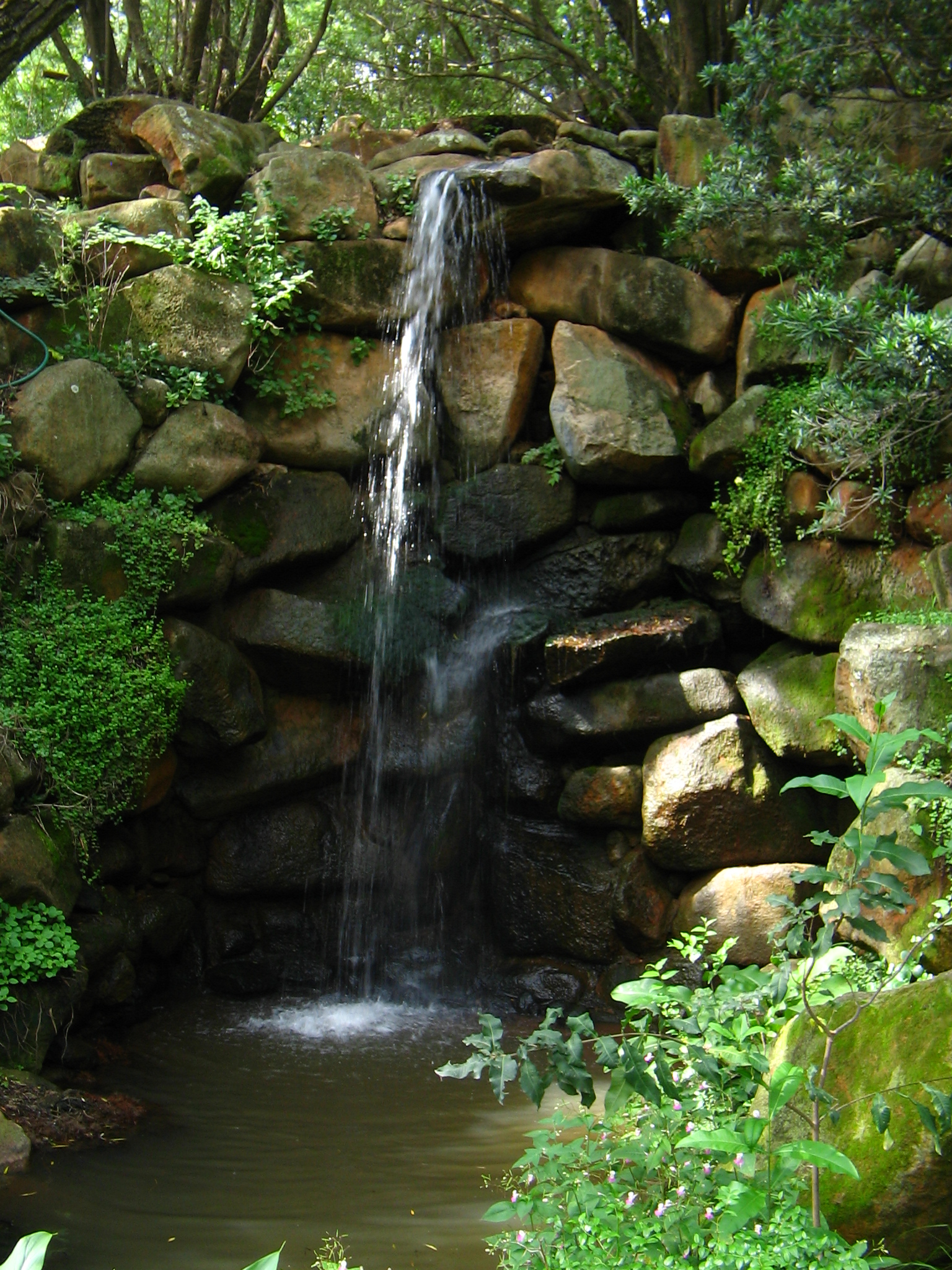
Man-made waterfall in the Garden

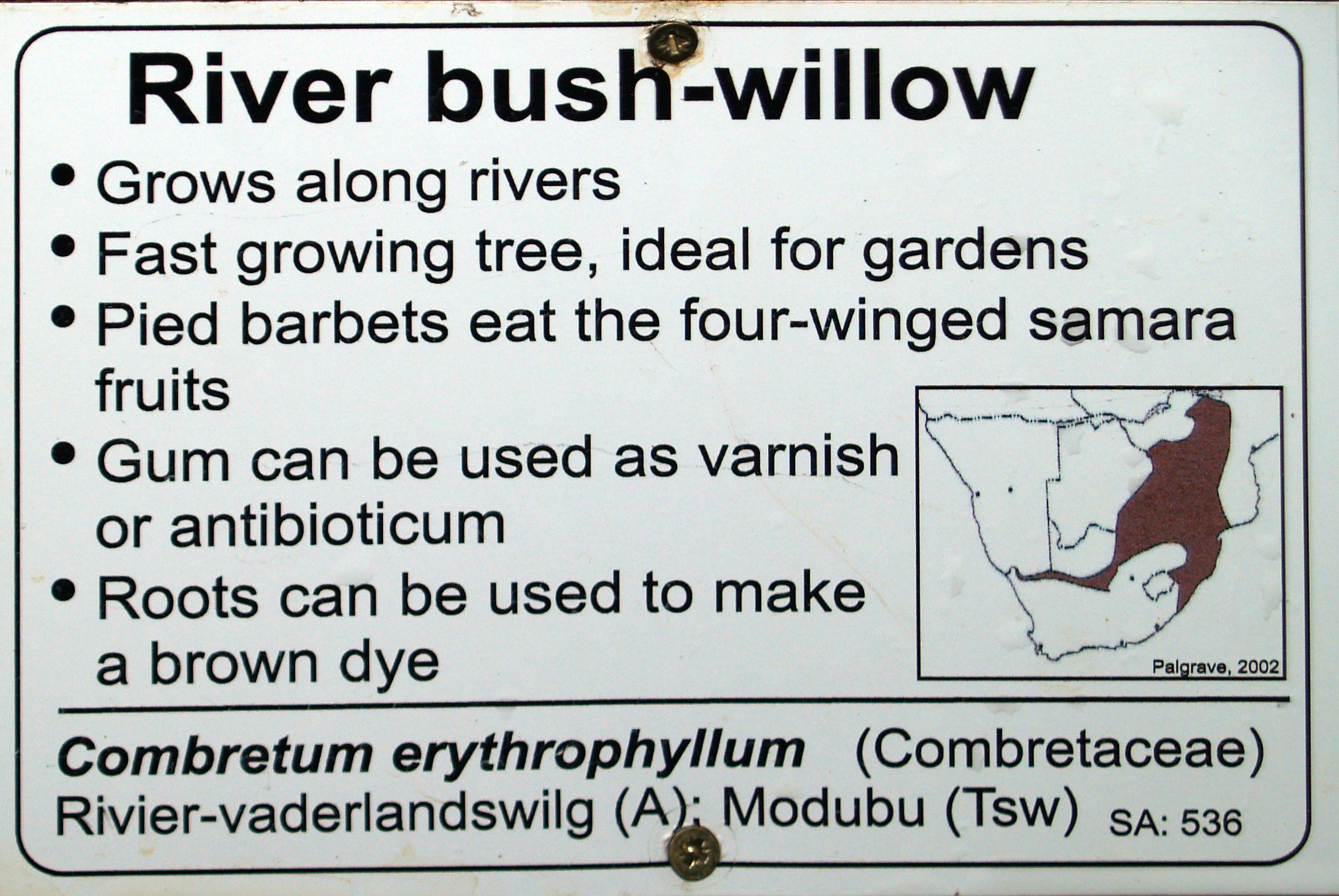
Visitor friendly plant label

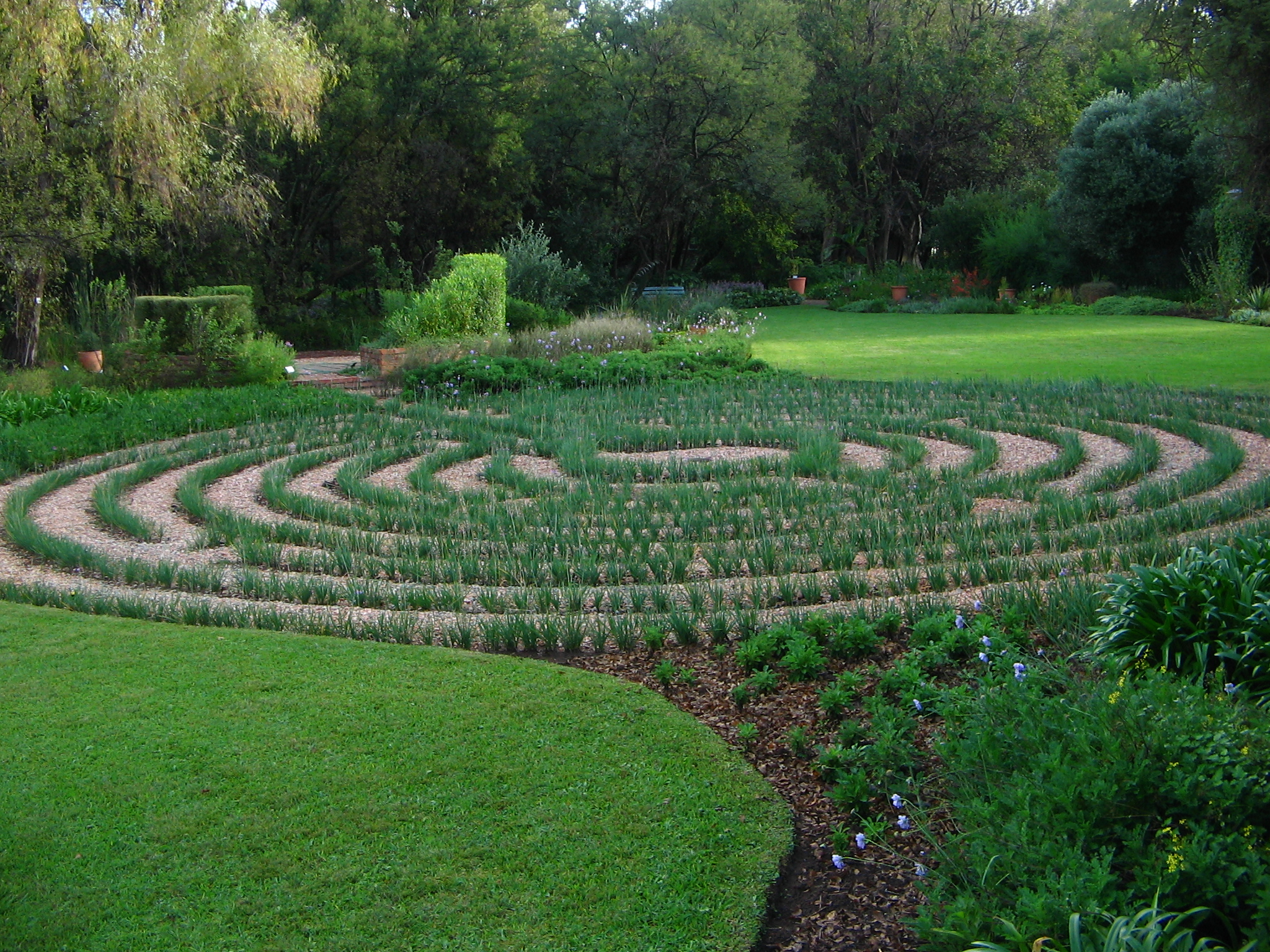
Low-maintenance Tulbaghia violacea maze/labyrinth

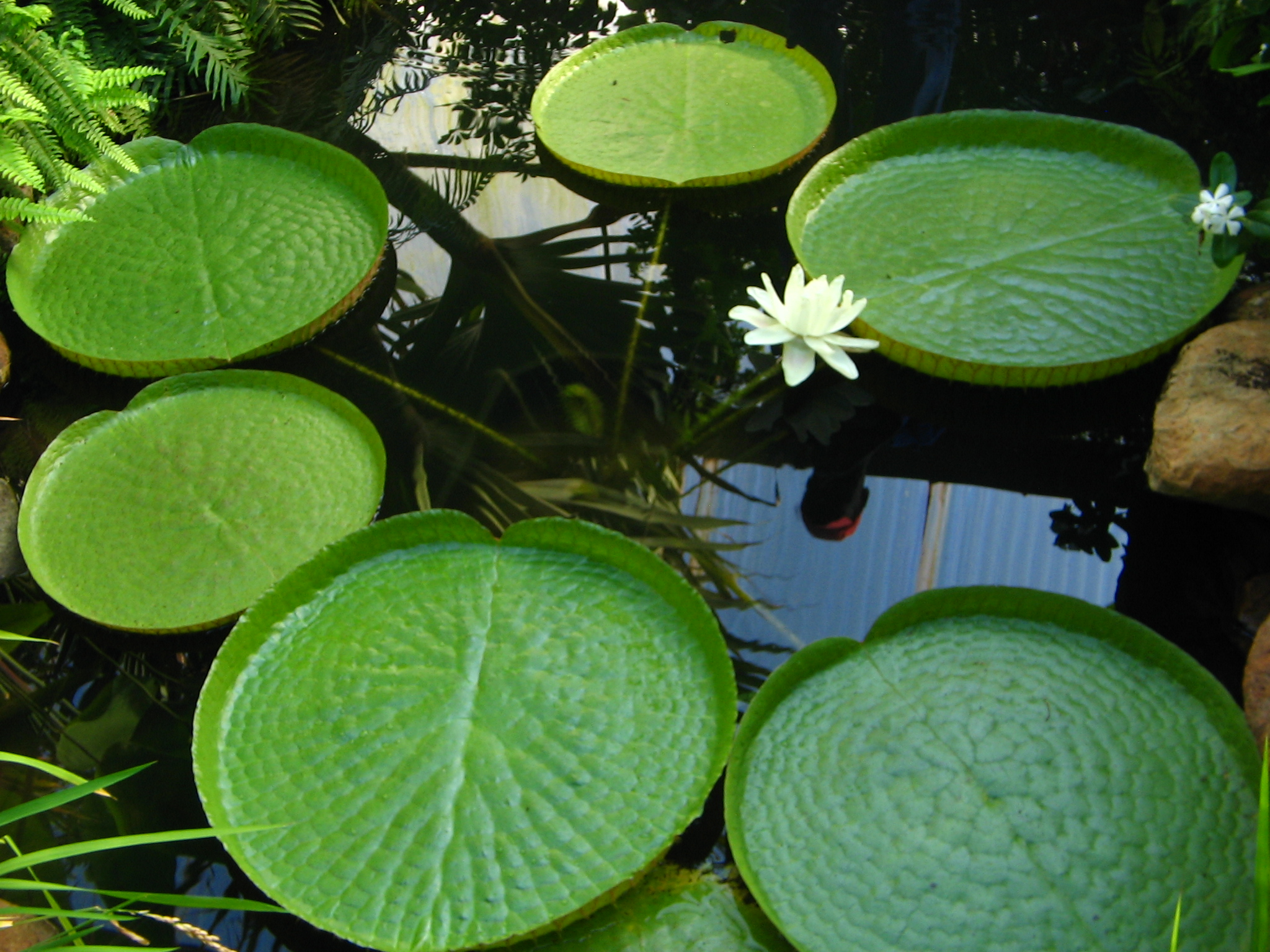
First flower of Victoria cruziana grown in 2010

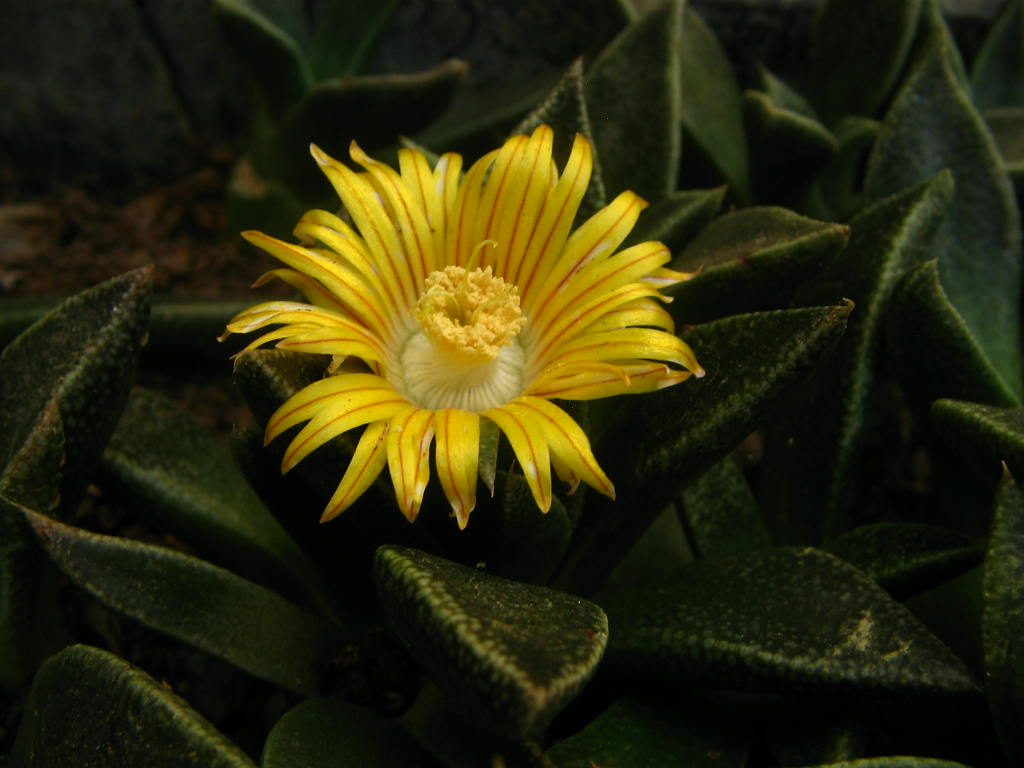
Nananthus vittatus

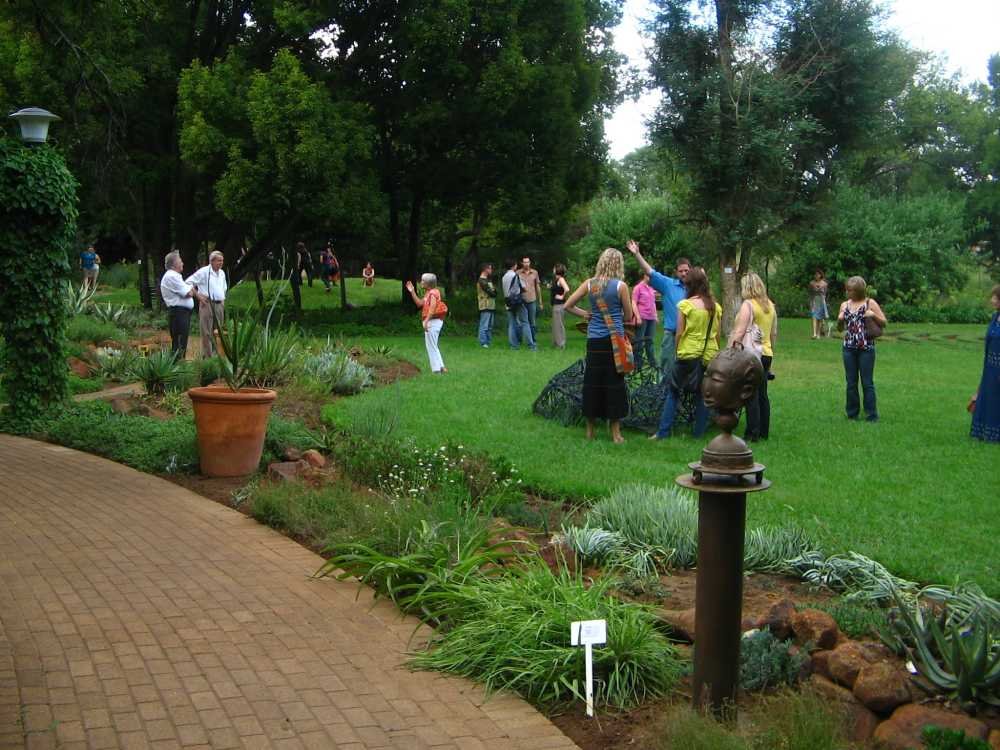
Sculpture exhibition 2008

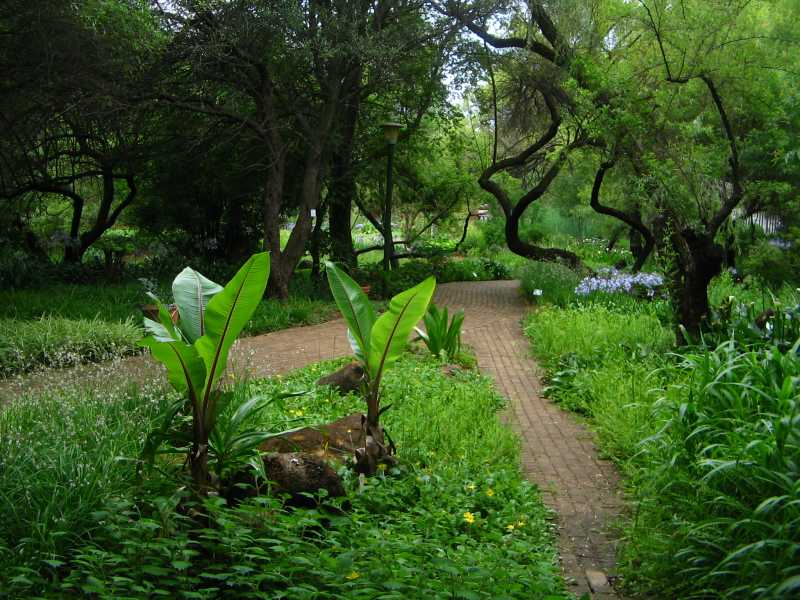

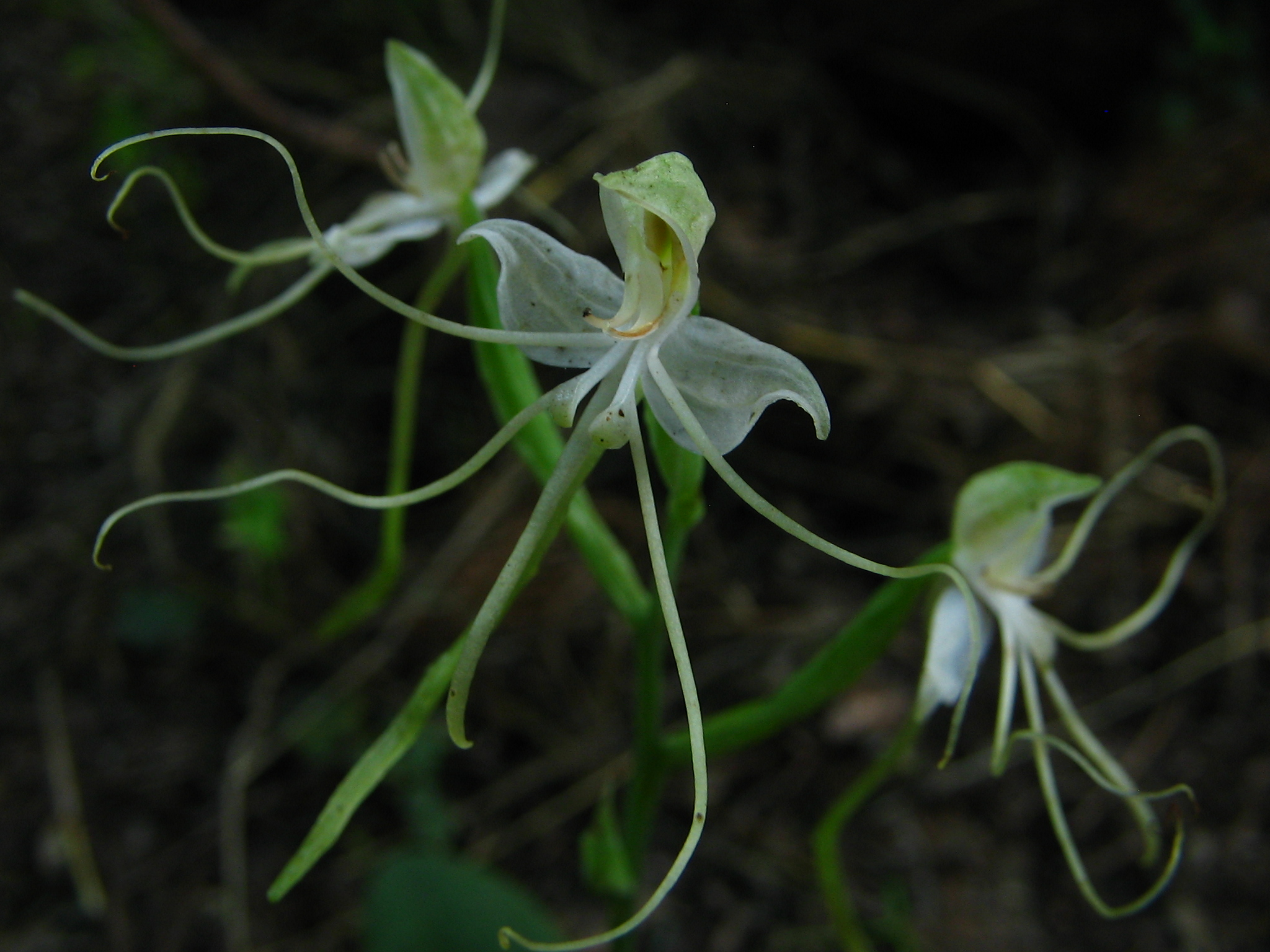
Bonatea polypodantha

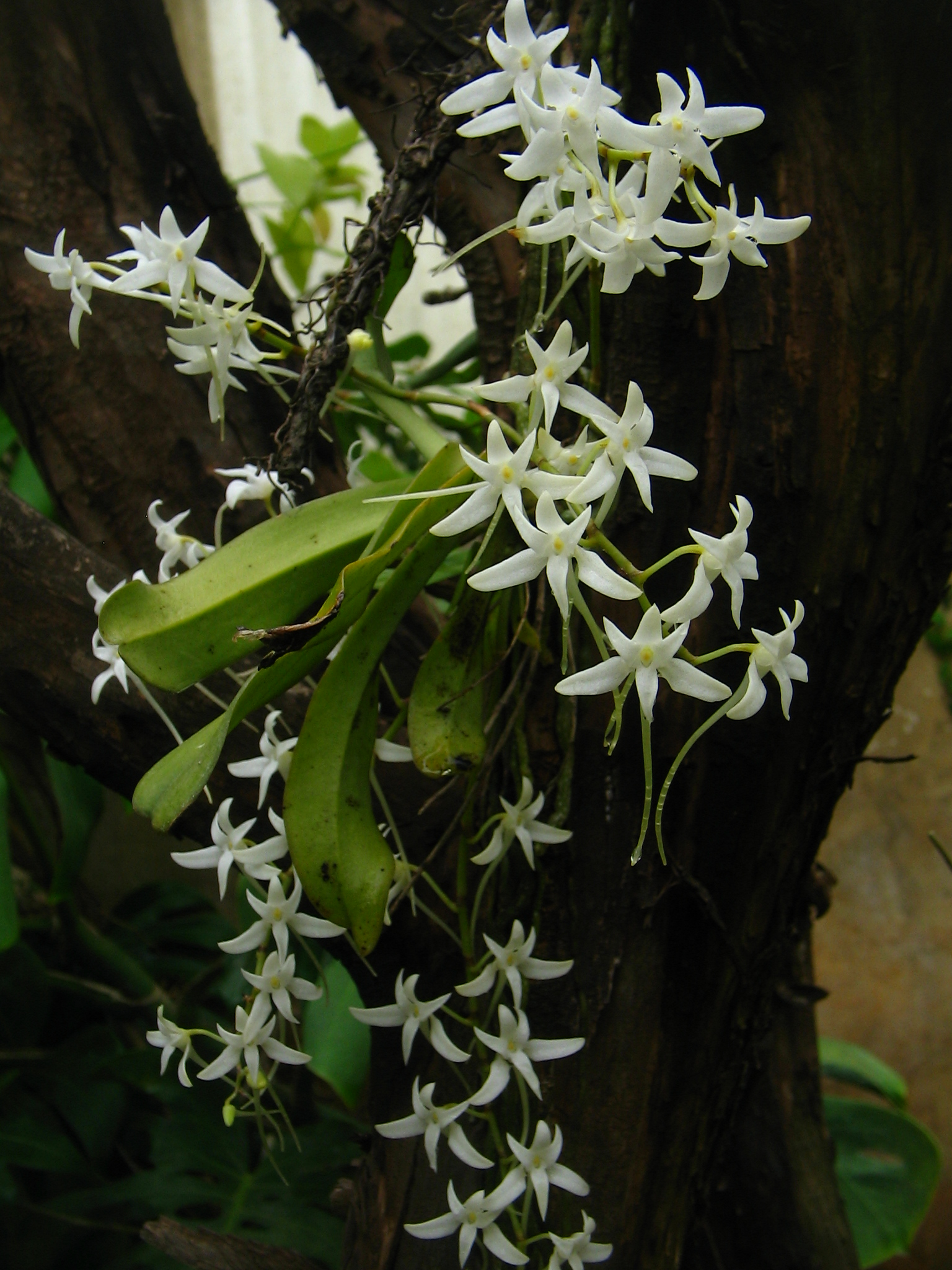
Mystacidium capense

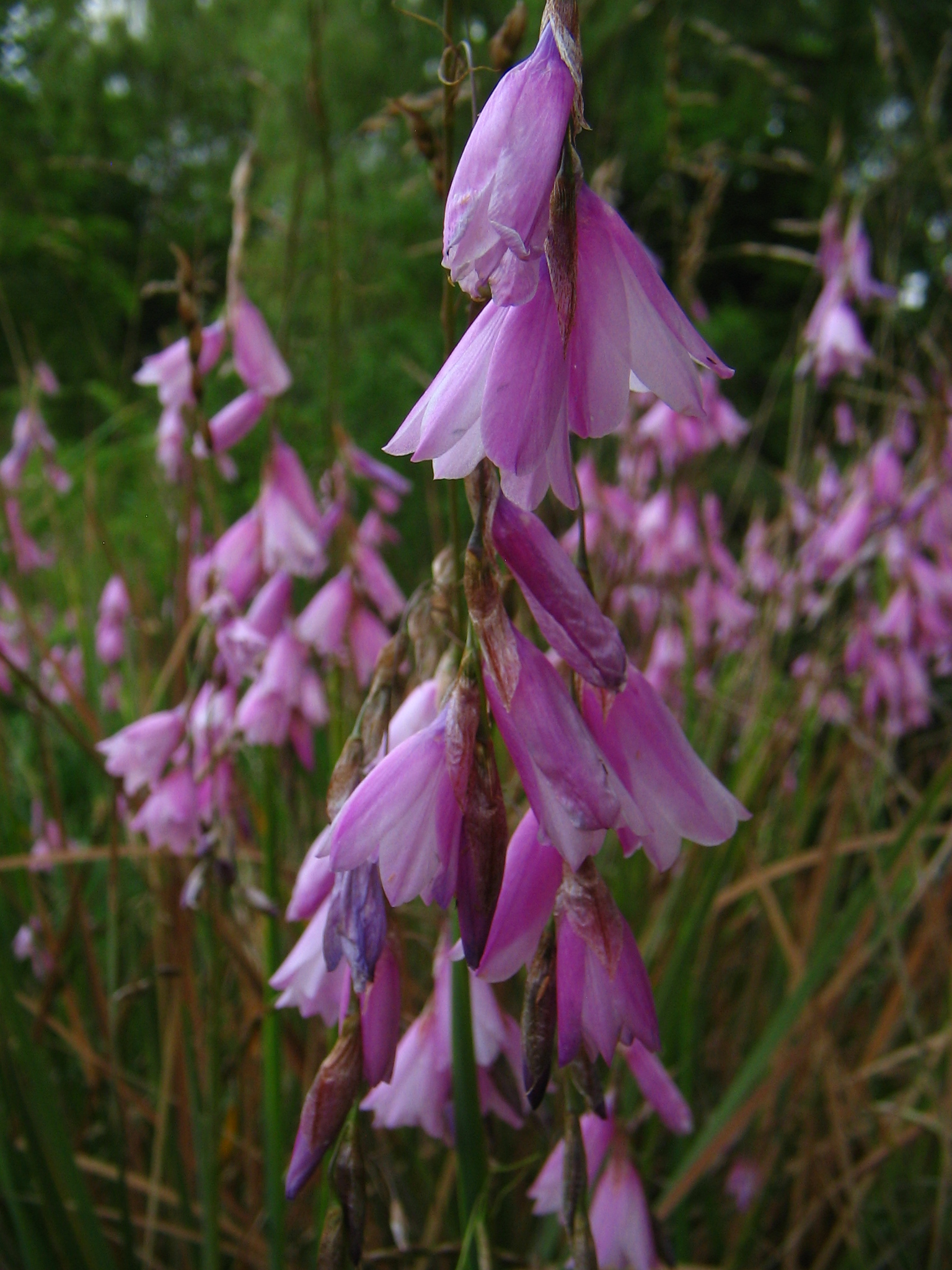
Dierama pendulum

== See also ==
- List of botanical gardens in South Africa
