= Free State National Botanical Garden =

National Botanical Garden just outside Bloemfontein, South Africa

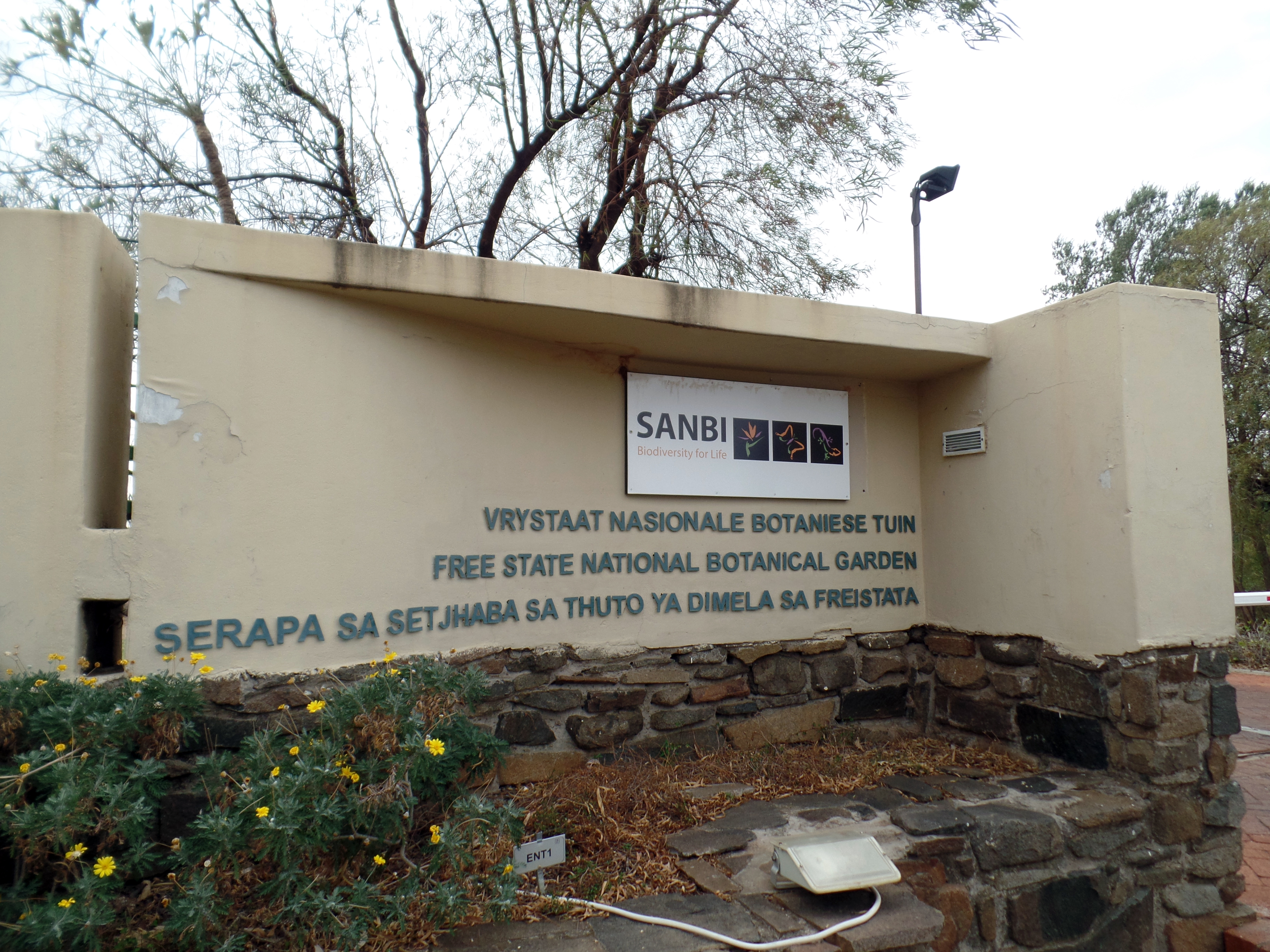
- Type: Botanical garden
- Location: Bloemfontein
- Coordinates: 29°03′08″S 26°12′39″E
- Area: 70 hectares (170 acres)
- Established: 1965; 60 years ago
- Administered by: South African National Biodiversity Institute
- Hiking trails: 4
- Species: 400
- Website: Free State National Botanical Garden - SANBI

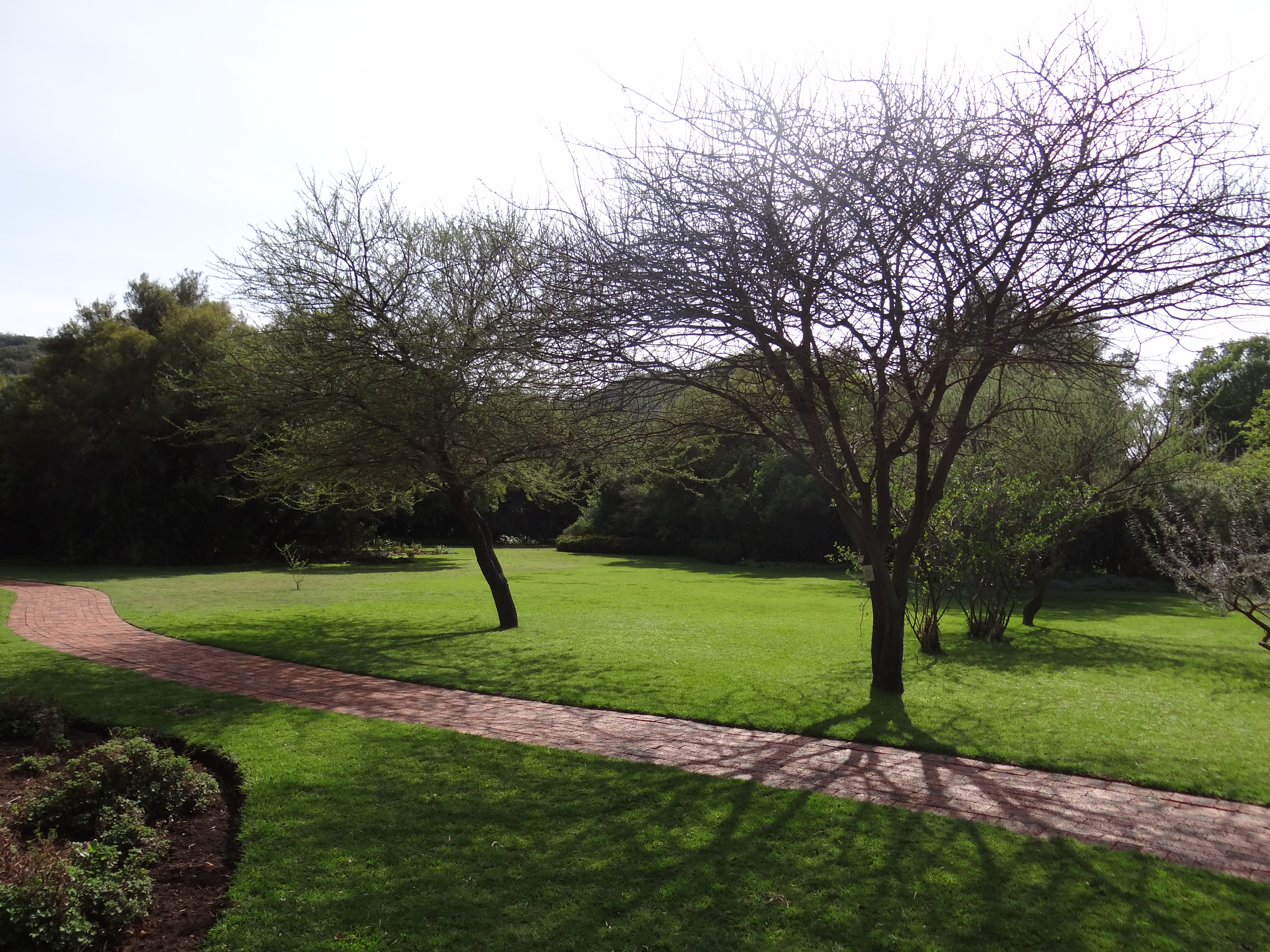
Walkway in the Free State National Botanical Garden

The Free State National Botanical Garden, located just outside Bloemfontein covers 70 hectares, and is home to about 400 species of plants, largely native to Free State and Northern Cape Provinces and Lesotho. Near Bain's Vlei, the garden was established in 1965, around 10 km north of downtown between picturesque dolerite rocks. 140 bird species, 50 mammal species, and 50 reptile species live in the park. A wild olive tree (Olea europaea subsp. africana) there is probably more than 200 years old. The herbarium preserves 50,000 species. There is also a bird hide, a dam, and wide lawns.

== See also ==
- List of botanical gardens in South Africa
