= Amathole Offshore Marine Protected Area =

Marine conservation area in the Eastern Cape in South Africa

- Amathole Offshore MPA location
- Location: Eastern Cape, South Africa
- Nearest city: East London
- Coordinates: 33°14′S 27°59′E
- Area: 400 km^{2}
- Established: 2019; 7 years ago
- Governing body: Eastern Cape Parks and Tourism Agency
- Amathole Offshore Marine Protected Area (South Africa)

The Amathole Offshore Marine Protected Area is an offshore conservation region, extending the Amathole Marine Protected Area in the territorial waters of South Africa.

== History ==
In the 1980s, a decline in line fish catches was observed by local fishermen who set aside three areas of coastal reef as voluntary refuges for fish stocks to recover: near the Gxulu River mouth, at Gonubie point and at the Kei River mouth. They lobbied for these areas to be declared official reserves, which was done in 1984, and in 2011 they were declared marine protected areas, and management taken on by the Eastern Cape Parks and Tourism Agency (ECPTA) The MPA was extended by the addition of the two offshore sectors in 2019.

== Purpose ==
The purpose of MPAs is to protect animals and ecosystems. Additionally, research scientists may work (conduct studies) associated with MPA wildlife and ecology.

A marine protected area is defined by the IUCN as "A clearly defined geographical space, recognised, dedicated and managed, through legal or other effective means, to achieve the long-term conservation of nature with associated ecosystem services and cultural values".

The MPA protects the red steenbras and seventy-four seabream, as well as a variety of other endemic reef fish.

== Extent ==
The offshore MPA comprises two offshore areas between Kei Mouth and Port Alfred in the Eastern Cape. The MPA includes the water column, sea bed and subsoil inside the boundaries. The area of ocean protected is about 400km^{2}.The continental shelf is narrow on this part of the coast, so the MPA covers both shelf and slope habitats to a depth of 2200 m, including the Gxulu canyon and the Kei river fan. The original three sections of the coastal MPA protect a total of 45km of coastline.

=== Boundaries ===
The Kei offshore (northern) area boundaries are:

- Northern boundary: S32°42.840', E28°25.260' to S32°43', E28°46'
- Eastern boundary: S32°43', E28°46' to E33°0', E28°46'
- Southern boundary: E33°0', E28°46' to S33°0', E28°11'
- Western boundary: S33°0', E28°11' to S32°50.717', E28°11.154'
- North-western boundary: S32°50.717', E28°11.154' to S32°49.464′, E28°12.900′
- North-eastern boundary: S32°49.464′, E28°12.900′ back to S32°42.840', E28°25.260' along the offshore boundary of the inshore Kei area of the original Amathole Marine Protected Area.

The Gxulu offshore (southern) area boundaries are:

- Eastern boundary: S33°9.513', E27°45.913' to S33°45', E27°46'
- Southern boundary: S33°45', E27°46' to S33°45', E27°11'
- Western boundary: S33°45', E27°11' to S33°35', E27°11'
- North-western boundary: S33°35', E27°11' to S33°14.018', E27°40.422'
- North-eastern boundary: S33°14.018', E27°40.422' to S33°9.513', E27°45.913' along the offshore boundary of the inshore Gxulu area of the original Amathole Marine Protected Area.

=== Zonation ===
There are two restricted areas and one controlled area.

==== Restricted areas ====
Kei offshore restricted zone is the whole northern zone within the boundaries described for the Kei offshore area

Gxulu offshore restricted zone boundaries:

- Eastern boundary: S33°9.513', E27°45.913' to S33°45', E27°46'
- Southern boundary: S33°45', E27°46' to S33°45', E27°11'
- South western boundary: S33°45', E27°11' to S33°35', E27°11'
- West northern boundary: S33°35', E27°11' to S33°35', E27°30'
- Central western boundary: S33°35', E27°30' to S33°30', E27°30'
- Central northern boundary: S33°30', E27°30' to S33°30', E27°40'
- North western boundary: S33°30', E27°40' to S33°14.018', E27°40.422'
- East northern boundary: S33°14.018', E27°40.422' back to S33°9.513', E27°45.913' along the offshore boundary of the Gxulu area of the original coastal Amathole MPA:

==== Controlled area ====
Gxulu offshore controlled zone:

- Northern boundary: S33°35', E27°11' to S33°14.018', E27°40.422'
- Eastern boundary: S33°14.018', E27°40.422' to S33°30', E27°40'
- East southern boundary: S33°30', E27°40' to S33°30', E27°30'
- South eastern boundary: S33°30', E27°30' to S33°35', E27°30'
- West southern boundary: S33°35', E27°30' back to S33°35', E27°11'

== Management ==
The marine protected areas of South Africa are the responsibility of the national government, which has management agreements with a variety of MPA management authorities, in this case the Eastern Cape Parks and Tourism Agency (ECPTA), which manages the MPA with funding from the SA Government through the Department of Environmental Affairs (DEA).

The Department of Environment, Forestry and Fisheries is responsible for issuing permits, quotas and law enforcement.

== Use ==
=== Activities requiring a permit ===
==== Fishing ====
List of game and bait fish species that may be caught in the controlled-pelagic zone of the Amathole offshore MPA: All species in the listed families may be caught.

Pelagic gamefish species:

- Carangidae – kingfish, garrick, yellowtail, queenfish, etc.
- Coryphaenidae – Dorado/dolphin fish
- Istiophoridae – Sailfish and marlin
- Pomatomidae – Shad/elf
- Rachycentridae – Prodigal son/Cobia
- Scombridae – Tunas, mackerels, wahoo, etc.
- Sphyraenidae – Barracudas
- Xiphiidae – Swordfish/broadbill

Pelagic baitfish species (includes carangids and scombrids as indicated above):

- Atherinidae – silversides
- Belonidae – garfish
- Chirocentridae – wolf herring/slimy
- Clupeidae – red-eyes, sardines, etc.
- Engraulidae – anchovies, glass-noses/bonies, etc.
- Exocoetidae - flyingfishes
- Hemiramphidae – halfbeaks
- Scomberesocidae - sauries

== Ecology ==
Marine ecoregions of the South African Exclusive Economic Zone: Amathole Marine Protected Area is in the ???? ecoregion

The MPA is in the warm temperate Agulhas ecoregion to the east of Cape Point which extends eastwards to the Mbashe River. There are a large proportion of species endemic to South Africa along this coastline.

(check below for applicability) Three major habitats exist in the sea in this region, Two of them distinguished by the nature of the substrate. The substrate, or base material, is important in that it provides a base to which an organism can anchor itself, which is vitally important for those organisms which need to stay in one particular kind of place. Rocky shores and reefs provide a firm fixed substrate for the attachment of plants and animals. Some of these may have Kelp forests, which reduce the effect of waves and provide food and shelter for an extended range of organisms. Sandy beaches and bottoms are a relatively unstable substrate and cannot many of the benthic organisms. Finally there is open water, above the substrate and clear of the kelp forest, where the organisms must drift or swim. Mixed habitats are also frequently found, which are a combination of those mentioned above. There are no significant estuarine habitats in the MPA.

Rocky reefs There are rocky reefs and mixed rocky and sandy bottoms. For many marine organisms the substrate is another type of marine organism, and it is common for several layers to co-exist. Examples of this are red bait pods, which are usually encrusted with sponges, ascidians, bryozoans, anemones, and gastropods, and abalone, which are usually covered by similar seaweeds to those found on the surrounding rocks, usually with a variety of other organisms living on the seaweeds.

The type of rock of the reef is of some importance, as it influences the range of possibilities for the local topography, which in turn influences the range of habitats provided, and therefore the diversity of inhabitants. Sandstone and other sedimentary rocks erode and weather very differently, and depending on the direction of dip and strike, and steepness of the dip, may produce reefs which are relatively flat to very high profile and full of small crevices. These features may be at varying angles to the shoreline and wave fronts. There are fewer large holes, tunnels and crevices in sandstone reefs, but often many deep but low near-horizontal crevices.

Sedimentary bottoms (including silt mud, sand, shelly, pebble and gravel bottoms) Sedimentary bottoms at first glance appear to be fairly barren areas, as they lack the stability to support many of the spectacular reef based species, and the variety of large organisms is relatively low. The sediment can be moved around by water action, to a greater or lesser degree depending on weather conditions and exposure of the area. This means that sessile organisms must be specifically adapted to areas of relatively loose substrate to thrive in them, and the variety of species found on a sandy or gravel bottom will depend on all these factors. Unconsolidated sedimentary bottoms have one important compensation for their instability, animals can burrow into the sand and move up and down within its layers, which can provide feeding opportunities and protection from predation. Other species can dig themselves holes in which to shelter, or may feed by filtering water drawn through the tunnel, or by extending body parts adapted to this function into the water above the sand.

The open sea The pelagic water column is the major part of the living space at sea. This is the water between the surface and the top of the benthic zone, where living organisms swim, float or drift, and the food chain starts with phytoplankton, the mostly microscopic photosynthetic organisms that convert the energy of sunlight into organic material which feeds nearly everything else, directly or indirectly. In temperate seas there are distinct seasonal cycles of phytoplankton growth, based on the available nutrients and the available sunlight. Either can be a limiting factor. Phytoplankton tend to thrive where there is plenty of light, and they themselves are a major factor in restricting light penetration to greater depths, so the photosynthetic zone tends to be shallower in areas of high productivity. Zooplankton feed on the phytoplankton, and are in turn eaten by larger animals. The larger pelagic animals are generally faster moving and more mobile, giving them the option of changing depth to feed or to avoid predation, and to move to other places in search of a better food supply.

=== Marine species diversity ===
==== Animals ====
Fish:

- Petrus rupestris (red steenbras)
- Polysteganus undulosus (seventyfour)

==== Endemism ====
The MPA is in the warm temperate Agulhas ecoregion to the east of Cape Point which extends eastwards to the Mbhashe River. There are a large proportion of species endemic to South Africa along this coastline.

== Threats ==
=== Seismic surveying ===
Seismic surveying conducted for the purposes of extracting gas or oil may be a significant threat to marine life in the MPA and beyond. The South African Association for Marine Biological Research (SAAMBR) have expressed concerns regarding how seismic activity in the area may disrupt marine animals dependent on sound for survival, such as animals who utilize echolocation, although the specific effects of seismic surveys on marine life are currently understudied. Additionally, pollution from operational waste during oil and gas exploration, such as drill cuttings or produced water, increase contamination in the water.

The Amathole Offshore MPA is also influenced by the Agulhas Current, a narrow, fast-flowing, and powerful western boundary current in the southwest Indian Ocean that follows the east coast of Africa. Scientists warn that seismic activity that disrupts natural oil or gas reserves may be drawn out by the Agulhas Current, magnifying the potential for a large-scale oil spill.

== See also ==
Marine protected areas of South Africa

- List of protected areas of South Africa
- Marine protected areas of South Africa – Protected areas of coastline or ocean in the EEZ of South Africa
