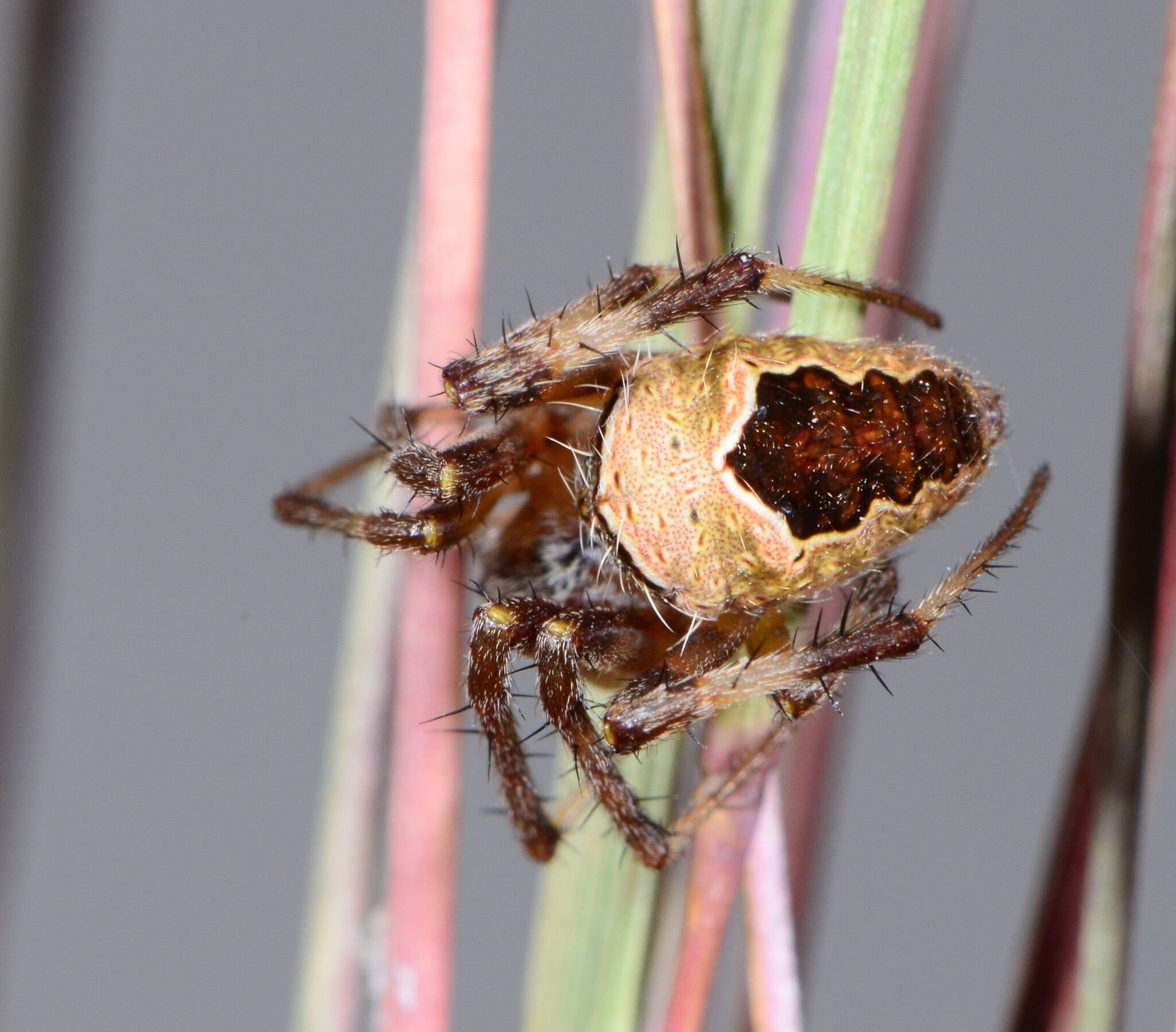
- Female
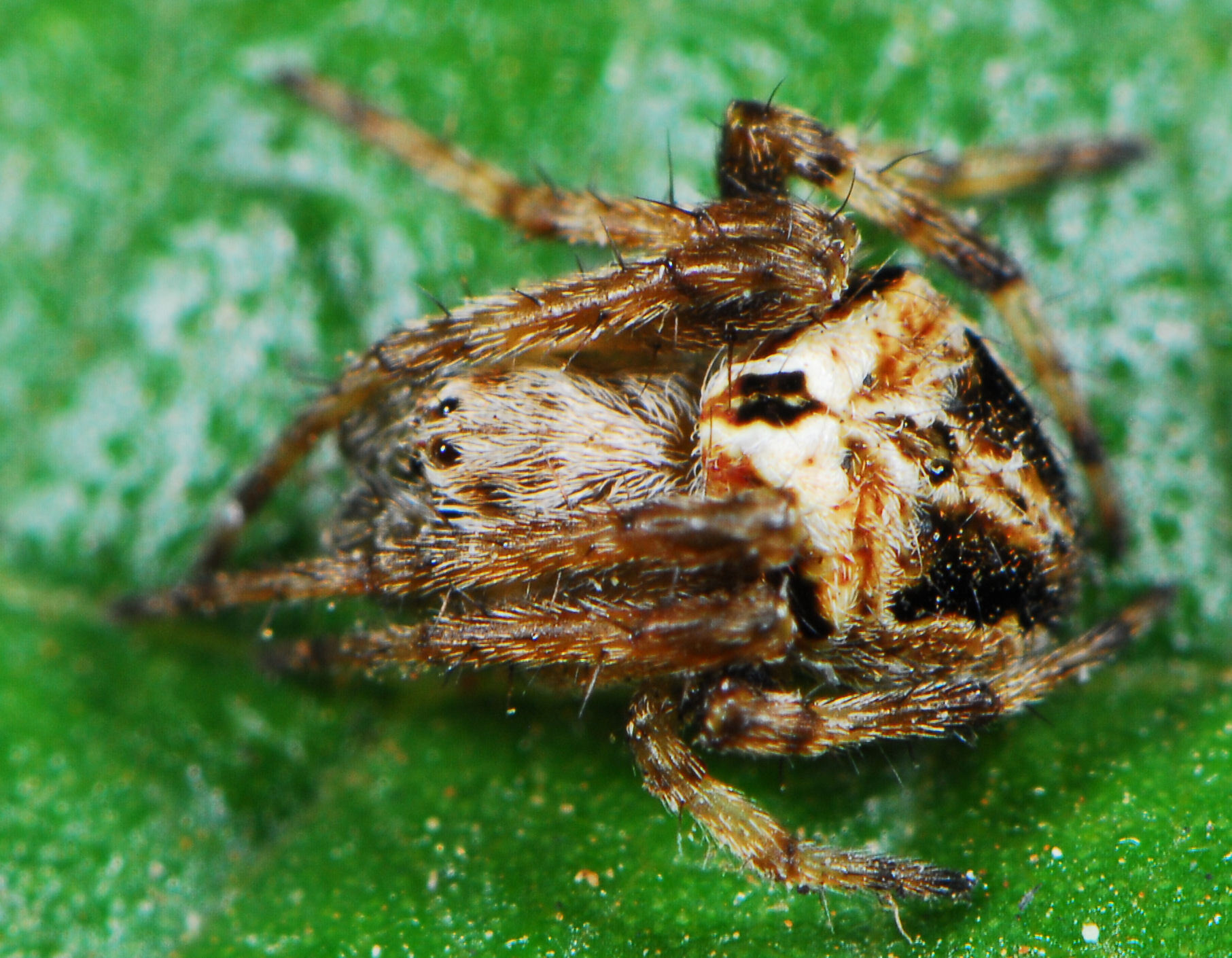
- Juvenile male

Scientific classification
- Kingdom: Animalia
- Phylum: Arthropoda
- Subphylum: Chelicerata
- Class: Arachnida
- Order: Araneae
- Infraorder: Araneomorphae
- Family: Araneidae
- Genus: Neoscona
- Species: N. blondeli

Binomial name
- Neoscona blondeli (Simon, 1885)

Synonyms
- Epeira blondeli Simon, 1886; Araneus bettoni Pocock, 1898; Araneus taruensis Pocock, 1898; Araneus blondeli Simon, 1907; Araneus gerhardti Caporiacco, 1949

= Neoscona blondeli =

Blondel's Neoscona Orb-Web Spider

Species of spider

Neoscona blondeli is a species of spider in the family Araneidae. It is commonly known as Blondel's Neoscona orb-web spider and is an endemic species to southern Africa.

== Distribution ==
Neoscona blondeli is distributed widely throughout Africa and has been sampled from Eswatini, Botswana, and South Africa.

In South Africa, the species has been recorded from all nine provinces at altitudes ranging from 1 to 2,826 m above sea level. Notable locations include Eastern Cape, Free State, Gauteng, KwaZulu-Natal, Limpopo, Mpumalanga, North West, Northern Cape, and Western Cape.

== Habitat and ecology ==
Neoscona blondeli is a very common orb-web species which builds webs in vegetation at night and removes them early in the morning. The species has been sampled from all the floral biomes except the Desert and Succulent Karoo biomes. It has also been found in crops such as avocado, cotton, pecans, pistachio, tomatoes and vineyards.

== Description ==
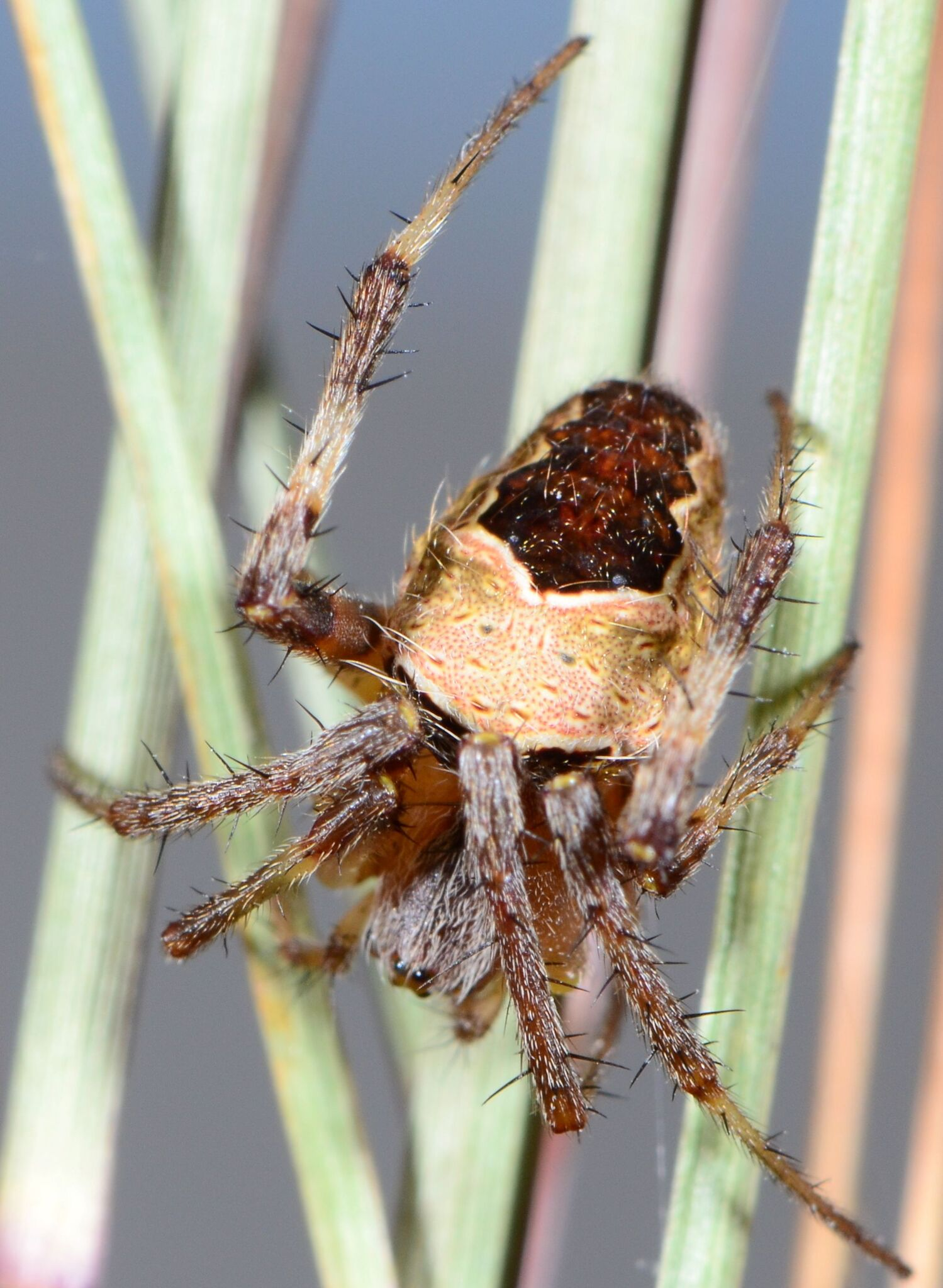
female

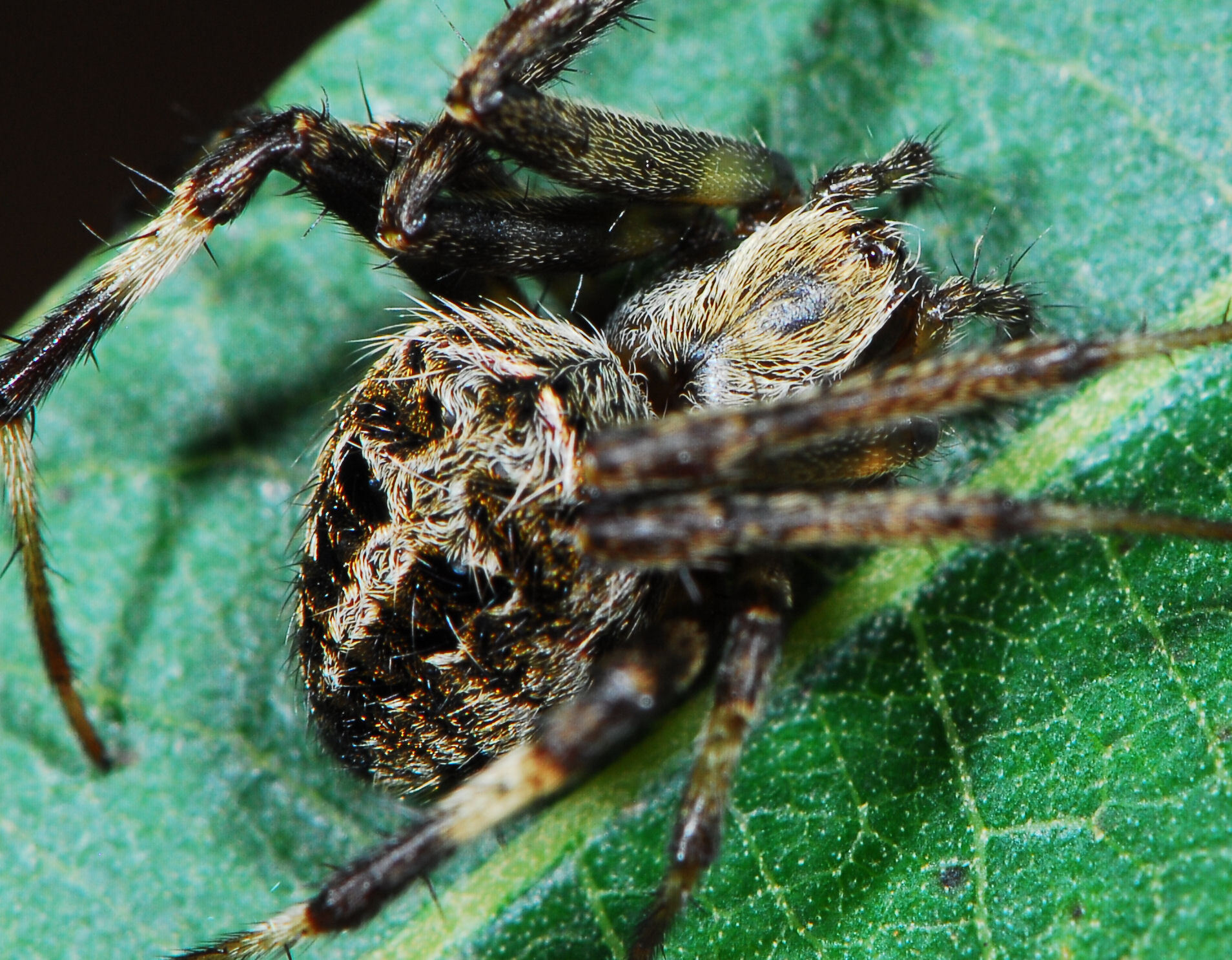
female

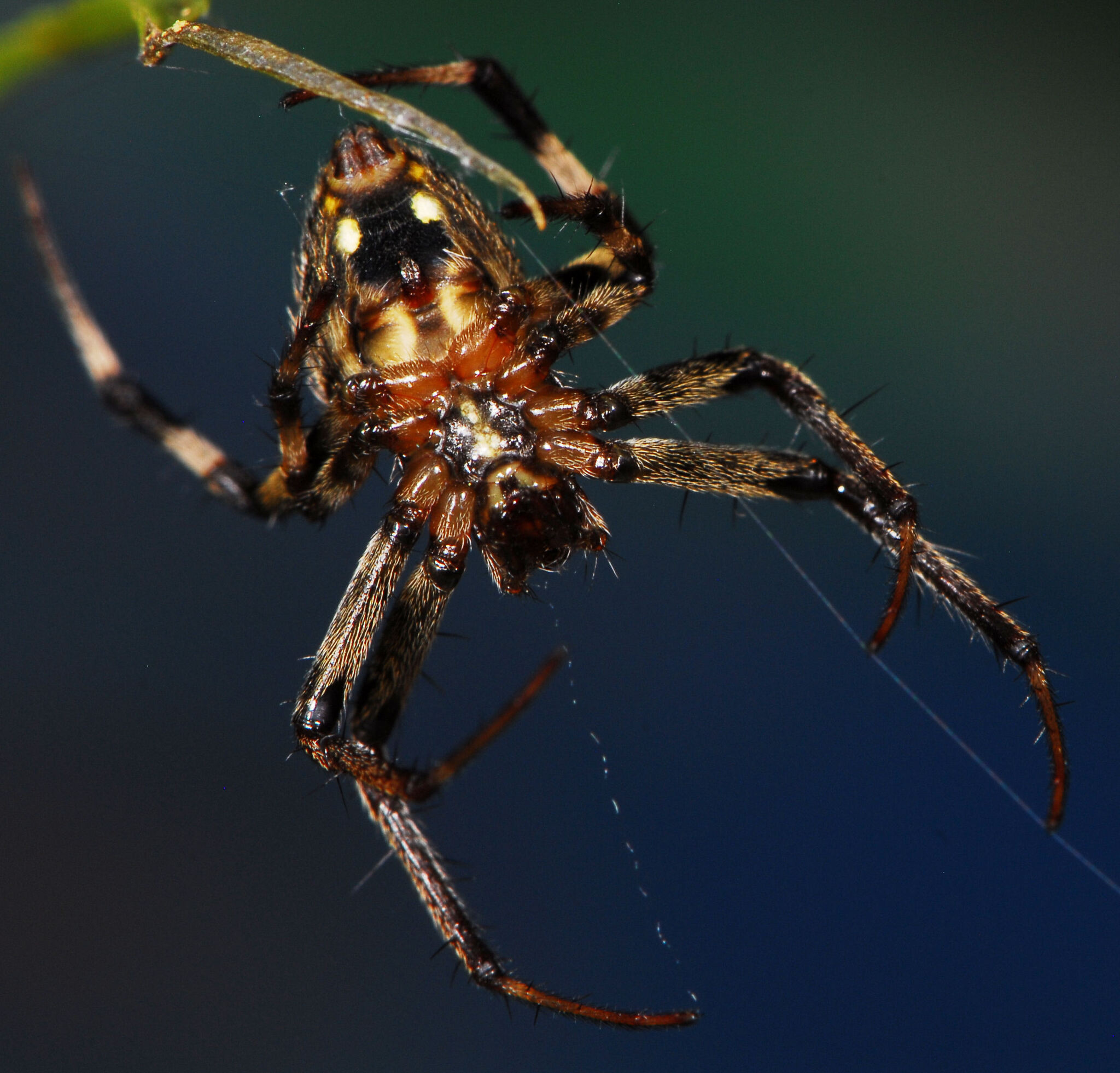
female

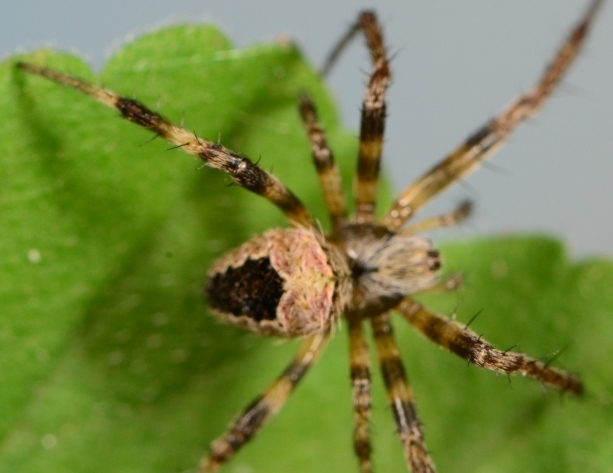
juvenile female

Neoscona blondeli is known from both sexes. As a very common orb-web species, it constructs webs in vegetation during nocturnal hours, removing them in the morning.

== Conservation ==
Neoscona blondeli is listed as Least Concern by the South African National Biodiversity Institute due to its wide geographical range. There are no known threats to the species. The species is present in more than 20 protected areas including Addo Elephant National Park, Karoo National Park, Mkambati Nature Reserve, and Ndumo Game Reserve.

== Taxonomy ==
The species was originally described by Eugène Simon in 1885 from Liberia as Epeira blondeli. It was revised by Grasshoff in 1986, who synonymized several species including Araneus bettoni, A. gerhardti, and A. taruensis.
