= Pondoland Marine Protected Area =

Marine conservation area in the Eastern Cape province of South Africa

- Pondoland MPA location
- Location: Eastern Cape province, South Africa
- Nearest city: Port St Johns
- Coordinates: 31°24.1′S 29°55.3′E
- Area: 1,380 km^{2} (530 sq mi)
- Established: 2004
- Governing body: ECPTA
- Pondoland Marine Protected Area (South Africa)

The Pondoland Marine Protected Area is an inshore conservation region in the territorial waters of South Africa.

== History ==
The MPA was proclaimed by the Minister of Environmental Affairs and Tourism, Marthinus van Schalkwyk, in Government Gazette No. 26431 of 4 June 2004 in terms Section 43 of the Marine Living Resources Act, 18 of 1998.

The MPA is named for the local Pondo people, and provides protection for threatened line fish.

== Purpose ==
A marine protected area is defined by the IUCN as "A clearly defined geographical space, recognised, dedicated and managed, through legal or other effective means, to achieve the long-term conservation of nature with associated ecosystem services and cultural values".

== Extent ==
The MPA is adjacent to the Mkhambathi Nature Reserve on the part of the South African east coast known as the "Wild Coast" – south of Port Edward and north of Port St Johns. It is approximately 90 km long with about 1380 km^{2} of protected ocean, and lies between the Mzamba River in the north and the Umzimvubu River in the south, extending 10 km out to sea. The central restricted zone is about 40 km long with an area of about 643 km^{2}.

=== Boundaries ===
The MPA includes the water column, the seabed, and the air-space to an altitude of 1000 m above sea level in the area bounded by:

- Western boundary: The high water mark between S31°06.6′, E030°10.5′ at the southern head of the Mzamba River, and S31°37.4′, E029°33.2′ at the northern head of the Mzimvubu River, including the banks of the tidal portions of the Mnyameni, Sikombe, Mtentu, Msikaba, Mkweni, Mboyti, Mzintlava, Mntafufu and Nkodusweni Rivers
- Northern boundary: A line bearing 128° from S31°06.8′, E030°10.5′ at the southern head of the Mzamba River, to S31°11.2′, E030°17.4′ at the 1000 m depth contour.
- Southern boundary: A line bearing 128° from S31°37.4′, E029°33.2′ at the northern head of the Mzimvubu River, to S31°41.7′ E029°39.8′ at the 1000 m depth contour, and
- Eastern boundary: A line approximating the 1000 m isobath, from S31°11.2′, E030°17.4′ to S31°15.3°, E030°13.7′ to S31°19.4′, E030°10.4′ to S31°22.9′, E030°06.1′ to S31°26.4′, E030°02.1′ to S31°30.65, E029°57.5′ to S31°34.7′, E029°54.5′ to S31°37.5′, E029°50.1′ to S31°40.7′, E029°45.6′ to S31°41.7′, E029°39.8′

=== Zonation ===
The MPA has several restricted (No take) and controlled zones in the offshore, inshore and estuarine areas.

==== Restricted areas ====
There are one offshore restricted zone, four inshore restricted zones, and two estuarine restricted zones.

The first offshore controlled zone is the part of the MPA to the north-east of a line bearing 128° from S31°13.2′, E030°04.1′ at the southern head of the Sikombe River. to S31°18.2′, E030°11.6′ at the 1000 m depth contour, excluding estuaries and the inter-tidal zone.

The second offshore controlled zone is the part of the MPA to the south-west of a line bearing 128° from S31°27.95′, E029°44.1′ at the northern head of the Mboyti River, to S31°34.7′, E029°54.5′ at the 1000 m depth contour, excluding estuaries and the inter-tidal zone.

Inshore restricted zone 1 is between the high-water mark and the 10 m depth contour from S31°10.3′, 030°07.5′ to S31°12.5′, E030°05.2′ at Red Hill, excluding estuaries.

Inshore restricted zone 2 is between the high-water mark and the 10 m depth contour from S31°14.8′, 030°02.9′ at the Mtentu River mouth to S31°16.8′, E030°01.2′ at Mgwegwe North, excluding estuaries.

Inshore restricted zone 3 is between the high-water mark and the 10 m depth contour from S31°17.6′, 030°00.6′ at Mgwegwe South to S31°19.3′, E029°58.0′ at the Msikaba River mouth, excluding estuaries.

Inshore restricted zone 4 is between the high-water mark and the 10 m depth contour from S31°25.4′, 029°51.2′ at the Lupatama River mouth to S31°27.0′, E029°45.3′ at the Mkozi river mouth, excluding estuaries.

The tidal parts of the Msikaba and Mtentu Rivers are estuarine restricted zones.

==== Controlled areas ====
There are two offshore controlled zones, five inshore controlled zones, and seven estuarine controlled zones.

The offshore restricted zone is the part of the MPA to the south-west of a line bearing 128° from S31°13.2′, E030°04.1′ at the southern head of the Sikombe River to S31°18.2′, E030°11.6′ at the 1000 m depth contour, and to the north-east of a line bearing 128° from S31°27.9′, E029°44.1′ at the northern head of the Mboyti River to S31°34.75′, E029°54.5′ at the 1000 m depth contour, excluding estuaries and the inter-tidal zone.

Inshore controlled zone 1 is between the high-water mark and the 10 m depth contour from S31°06.6′, E030°10.5′ at the Mzamba River mouth to S31°10.3′, 030°07.5′, excluding estuaries.

Inshore controlled zone 2 is between the high-water mark and the 10 m depth contour from S31°12.5′, E030°05.2′ at Red Hill to S31°14.8′, 030°02.9′ at the Mtentu River mouth, excluding estuaries.

Inshore controlled zone 3 is between the high-water mark and the 10 m depth contour from S31°16.8′, E030°01.2′ at Mgwegwe North to S31°17.6′, 030°00.6′ at Mgwegwe South, excluding estuaries.

Inshore controlled zone 4 is between the high-water mark and the 10 m depth contour from S31°19.3′, E029°58.0′ at the Msikaba River mouth to S31°25.4′, 029°51.2′ at the Lupatama River mouth, excluding estuaries.

Inshore controlled zone 5 is between the high-water mark and the 10 m depth contour from S31°27.0′, E029°45.3′ at the Mkozi river mouth to S31°37.4′, 029°33.2′ at the Mzimvubu River mouth, excluding estuaries.

The tidal parts of the Mboyti, Mkweni, Mntafufu, Mnyameni, Mzintlava, Nkodusweni, and Sikombe Rivers are estuarine controlled zones.

== Management ==
The marine protected areas of South Africa are the responsibility of the national government, which has management agreements with a variety of MPA management authorities, in this case, the Eastern Cape Provincial Tourism Agency, (ECPTA), which manages the MPA with funding from the SA Government through the Department of Environmental Affairs (DEA).

The Department of Agriculture, Forestry and Fisheries is responsible for issuing permits, quotas and law enforcement.

=== Scuba diving ===
The many rivers along this coast carry silt and during the rainy season the visibility is often poor. Strong currents are common. May and June are often the best months for diving this region. Water temperatures range from about 25°C in summer to about 19°C in winter. The sub-tidal environment is mainly shelving rocky reefs parallel to the coastline. The best diving is in the 12 to 40 m depth range. In the northern parts of the MPA reefs are generally within 3 km of the shore. Launches may be from Port Edward or Mbotyi.

There is diveable reef off the Mzamba river just outside the MPA, and further south off the Mnyameni River in the northern controlled area, and off the Sikombe river at the border of the restricted zone. Further south there is a large area of reef off the Mtentu River inside the no-take zone, and off the Mkhambati reserve near Mgwegwe. Further south the visibility is often poor due to upwelling from an eddy between Port St Johns and Waterfall bluff.

== Geography ==
=== General topography ===
The MPA covers the continental shelf, which is narrow in this region, and the upper continental slope to 1000m depth.

== Ecology ==
Marine ecoregions of the South African Exclusive Economic Zone: Pondoland Marine Protected Area is in the Agulhas ecoregion

(describe position, biodiversity and endemism of the region) The MPA is in the warm temperate Agulhas ecoregion to the east of Cape Point which extends eastwards to the Mbashe River. There are a large proportion of species endemic to South Africa along this coastline. This part of the coastal waters is a transition zone with elements of sub-tropical and warm temperate ecosystems.

Four major habitats exist in the sea in this region, distinguished by the nature of the substrate. The substrate, or base material, is important in that it provides a base to which an organism can anchor itself, which is vitally important for those organisms which need to stay in one particular kind of place. Rocky shores and reefs provide a firm fixed substrate for the attachment of plants and animals. Some of these may have kelp forests, which reduce the effect of waves and provide food and shelter for an extended range of organisms. Sandy beaches and bottoms are a relatively unstable substrate and cannot anchor kelp or many of the other benthic organisms. Finally there is open water, above the substrate and clear of the kelp forest, where the organisms must drift or swim. Mixed habitats are also frequently found, which are a combination of those mentioned above. There are no significant estuarine habitats in the MPA.

Rocky shores and reefs There are rocky reefs and mixed rocky and sandy bottoms. For many marine organisms the substrate is another type of marine organism, and it is common for several layers to co-exist. Examples of this are red bait pods, which are usually encrusted with sponges, ascidians, bryozoans, anemones, and gastropods, and abalone, which are usually covered by similar seaweeds to those found on the surrounding rocks, usually with a variety of other organisms living on the seaweeds.

The type of rock of the reef is of some importance, as it influences the range of possibilities for the local topography, which in turn influences the range of habitats provided, and therefore the diversity of inhabitants. Sandstone and other sedimentary rocks erode and weather very differently, and depending on the direction of dip and strike, and steepness of the dip, may produce reefs which are relatively flat to very high profile and full of small crevices. These features may be at varying angles to the shoreline and wave fronts. There are fewer large holes, tunnels and crevices in sandstone reefs, but often many deep but low near-horizontal crevices.

Sandy beaches and bottoms (including shelly, pebble and gravel bottoms) Sandy bottoms at first glance appear to be fairly barren areas, as they lack the stability to support many of the spectacular reef based species, and the variety of large organisms is relatively low. The sand is continually being moved around by wave action, to a greater or lesser degree depending on weather conditions and exposure of the area. This means that sessile organisms must be specifically adapted to areas of relatively loose substrate to thrive in them, and the variety of species found on a sandy or gravel bottom will depend on all these factors. Sandy bottoms have one important compensation for their instability, animals can burrow into the sand and move up and down within its layers, which can provide feeding opportunities and protection from predation. Other species can dig themselves holes in which to shelter, or may feed by filtering water drawn through the tunnel, or by extending body parts adapted to this function into the water above the sand.

The open sea The pelagic water column is the major part of the living space at sea. This is the water between the surface and the top of the benthic zone, where living organisms swim, float or drift, and the food chain starts with phytoplankton, the mostly microscopic photosynthetic organisms that convert the energy of sunlight into organic material which feeds nearly everything else, directly or indirectly. In temperate seas there are distinct seasonal cycles of phytoplankton growth, based on the available nutrients and the available sunlight. Either can be a limiting factor. Phytoplankton tend to thrive where there is plenty of light, and they themselves are a major factor in restricting light penetration to greater depths, so the photosynthetic zone tends to be shallower in areas of high productivity. Zooplankton feed on the phytoplankton, and are in turn eaten by larger animals. The larger pelagic animals are generally faster moving and more mobile, giving them the option of changing depth to feed or to avoid predation, and to move to other places in search of a better food supply.

The area is a transitional ecosystem, so the marine life is a mix of subtropical and warm-temperate species with a high variation from north to south along the coast. The restricted zone is fully protected from fishing, and is distinctly richer in fish life, particularly large predators. The benthic community is dominated by coralline seaweeds, gorgonian sea fans and large sponges, as the MPA is too far south of the equator for warm-water reef-building corals.

=== Marine species diversity ===
==== Animals ====
- Petrus rupestris (red steenbras) endemic
- Cymatoceps nasutus (black mussel cracker) endemic
- Polysteganus undulosus (seventy-four) endemic to southern Africa
- Polysteganus praeorbitalis (scotsman) endemic to southern Africa
- Chrysoblephus puniceus (slinger) endemic to Southern Africa
- Epinephelus marginatus (yellowbelly rockcod)
- Epinephelus andersoni (catface rockcod) endemic to southern Africa
- Apolemichthys kingi (tiger angelfish) – uncommon endemic

==== Endemism ====
The MPA is in the warm temperate Agulhas ecoregion to the east of Cape Point which extends eastwards to the Mbhashe River. There is a large proportion of species endemic to South Africa along this coastline.

== See also ==
Marine protected areas of South Africa
- List of protected areas of South Africa
- Marine protected areas of South Africa – Protected areas of coastline or ocean in the EEZ of South Africa
