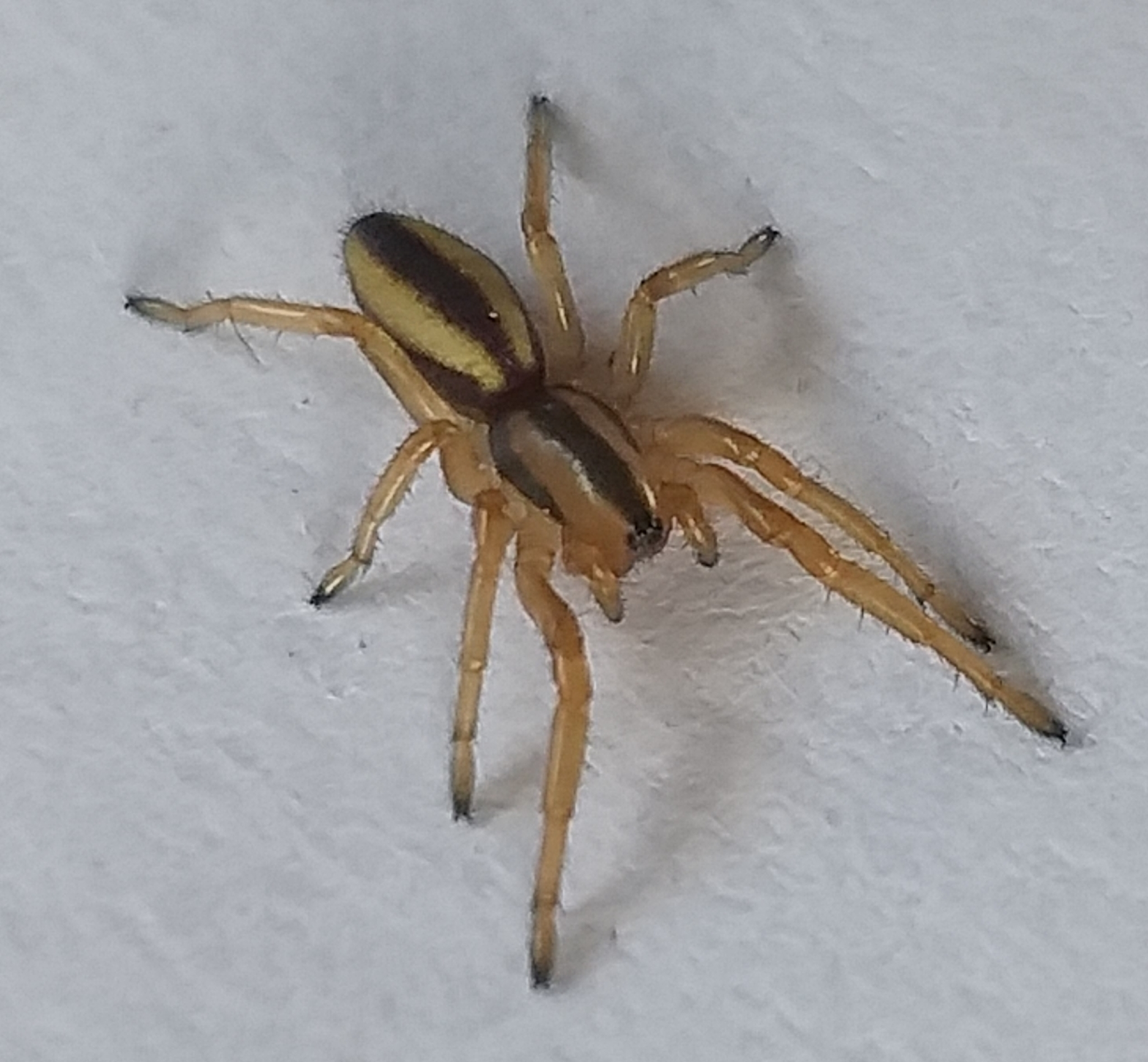
- Female
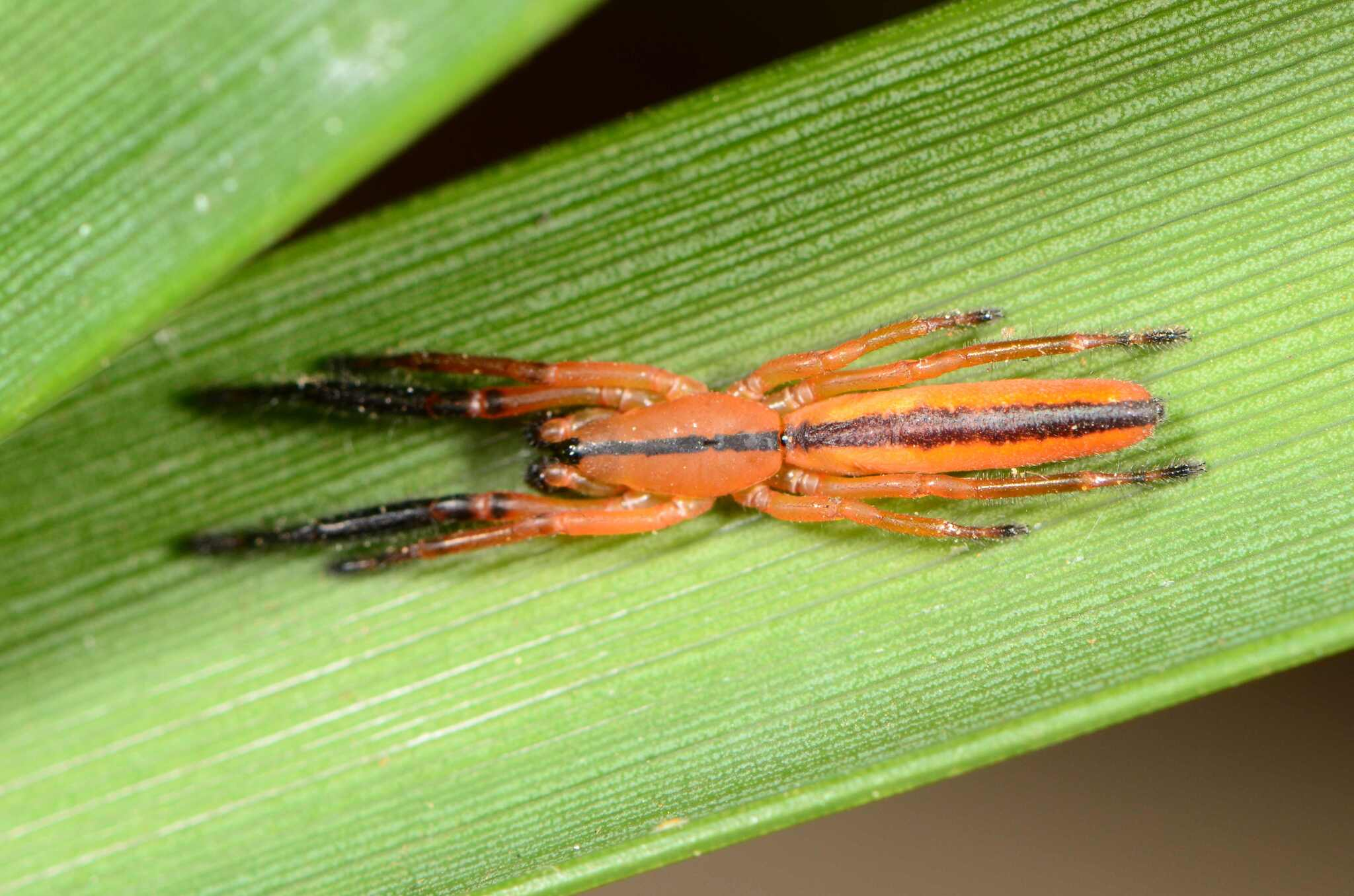
- Male

Scientific classification
- Kingdom: Animalia
- Phylum: Arthropoda
- Subphylum: Chelicerata
- Class: Arachnida
- Order: Araneae
- Infraorder: Araneomorphae
- Family: Zodariidae
- Genus: Chariobas
- Species: C. lineatus

Binomial name
- Chariobas lineatus Pocock, 1900

= Chariobas lineatus =

Striped Chariobas Grass-Stitching spider

Species of spider

Chariobas lineatus is a species of spider in the family Zodariidae. It is endemic to South Africa and is commonly known as the Striped Chariobas Grass-Stitching spider.

== Distribution ==
Chariobas lineatus is found in three provinces of South Africa: Eastern Cape, KwaZulu-Natal, and Western Cape. The species was originally described from King William's Town in the Eastern Cape. It occurs at elevations ranging from 1 to 699 m above sea level.

== Habitat ==
The species is a free-living plant-dweller that inhabits grasses and sedges, which it stitches together to form narrow tubes. It has been sampled from the Fynbos, Thicket, and Grassland biomes.

== Description ==
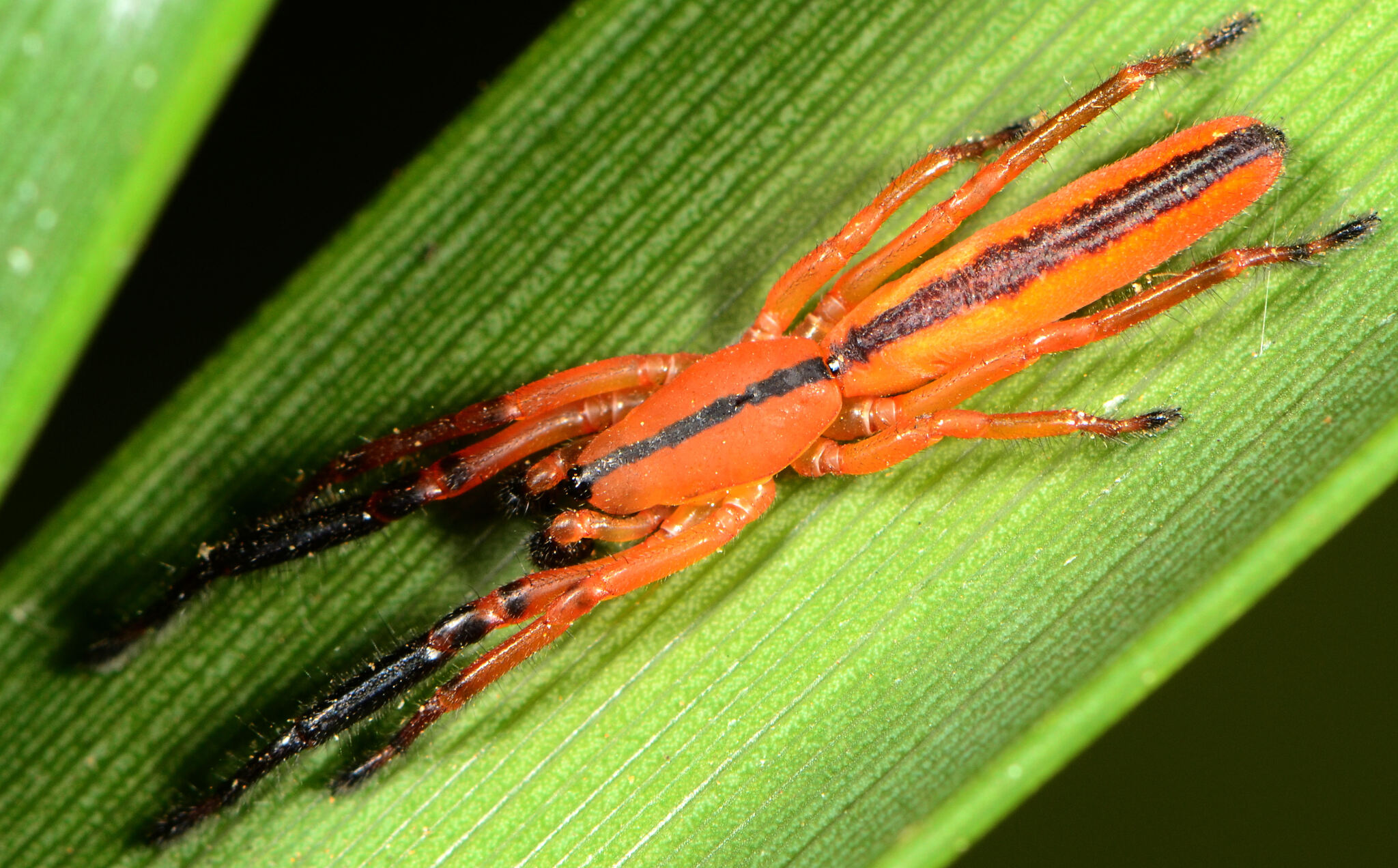
male

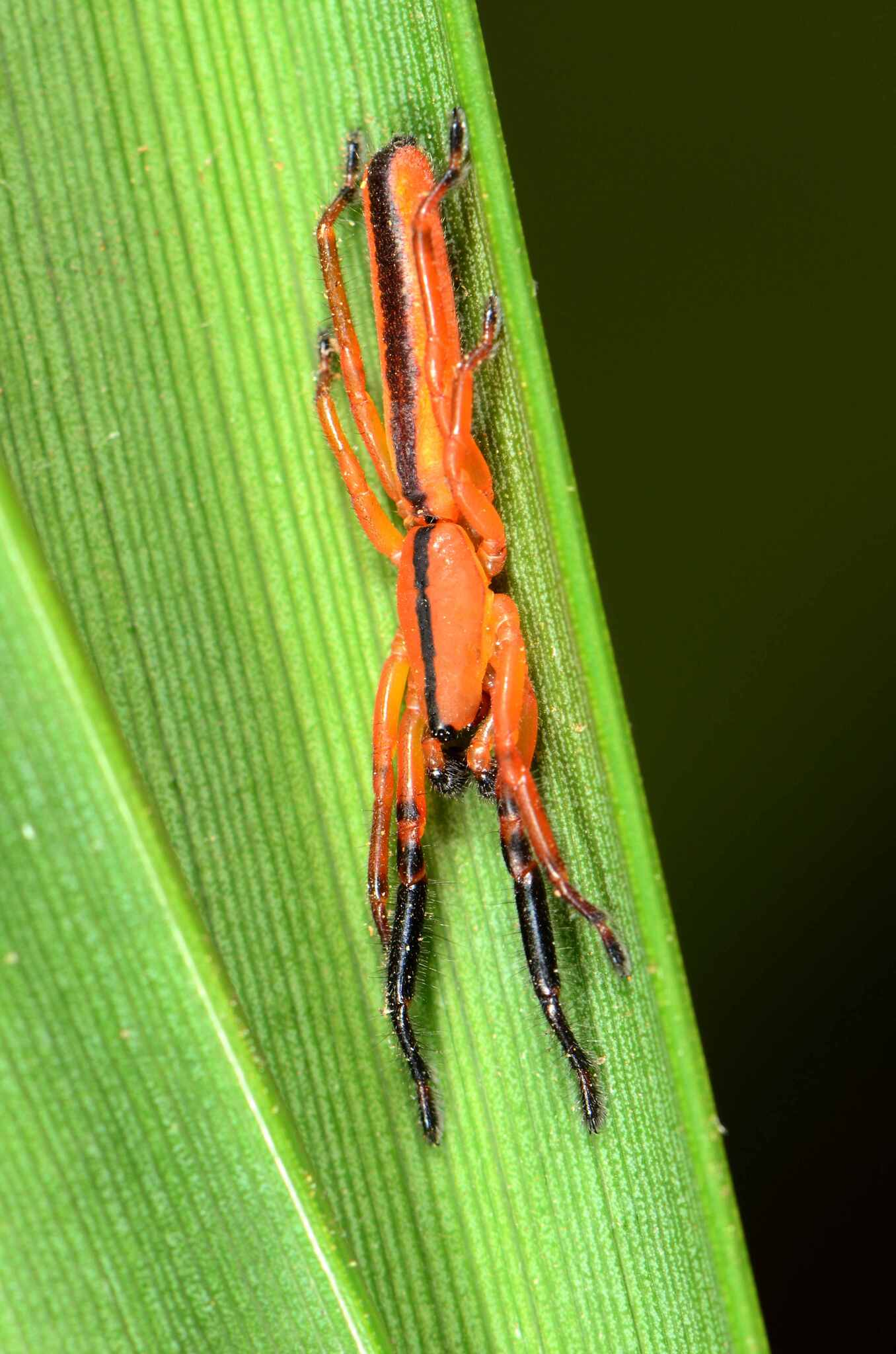
male

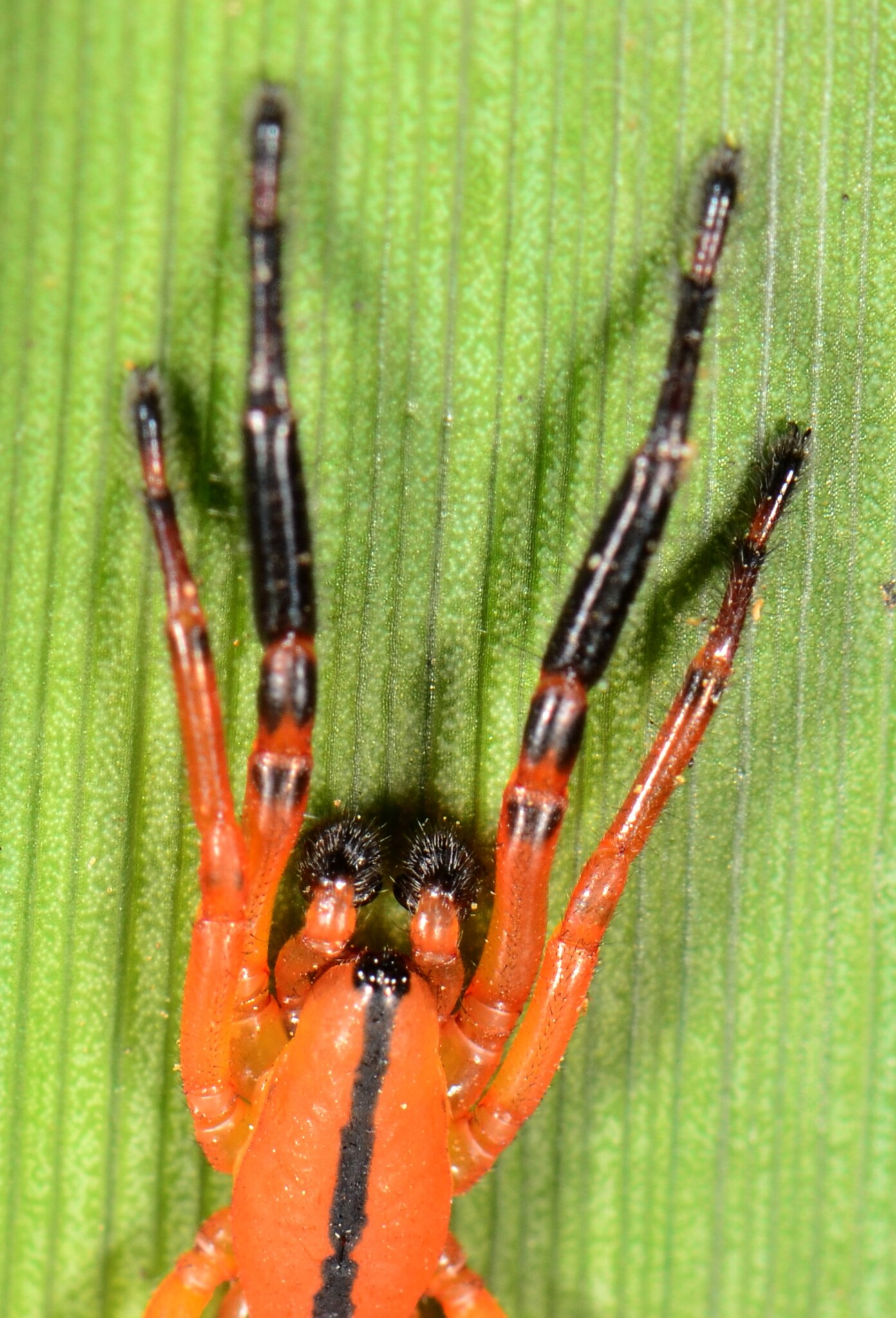
male

The species is known primarily from juveniles. The carapace is bright reddish-yellow with a median longitudinal black band and a much narrower black marginal band. The sternum is black at the sides with a pale median stripe. The opisthosoma is chalky-grey with a median longitudinal dorsal black band extending to the spinnerets, continuing the black band from the carapace. A similar stripe runs along the ventral midline that gradually expands posteriorly. The legs are orange-yellow, darker apically, with black tarsal and protarsal scopulae.

== Ecology ==
Like other species in the genus, Chariobas lineatus constructs silk retreats within the grass tubes it creates by stitching grass and sedge stems together. Their egg sacs are deposited in these tube nests.

== Conservation ==
The species is listed as Least Concern by the South African National Biodiversity Institute. Although only known from juveniles, it has a wide enough distribution across three provinces to warrant this conservation status. It is protected in several reserves including Mkambati Nature Reserve, Bontebok National Park, Jonkershoek Nature Reserve, and the Kogelberg Biosphere Reserve.
