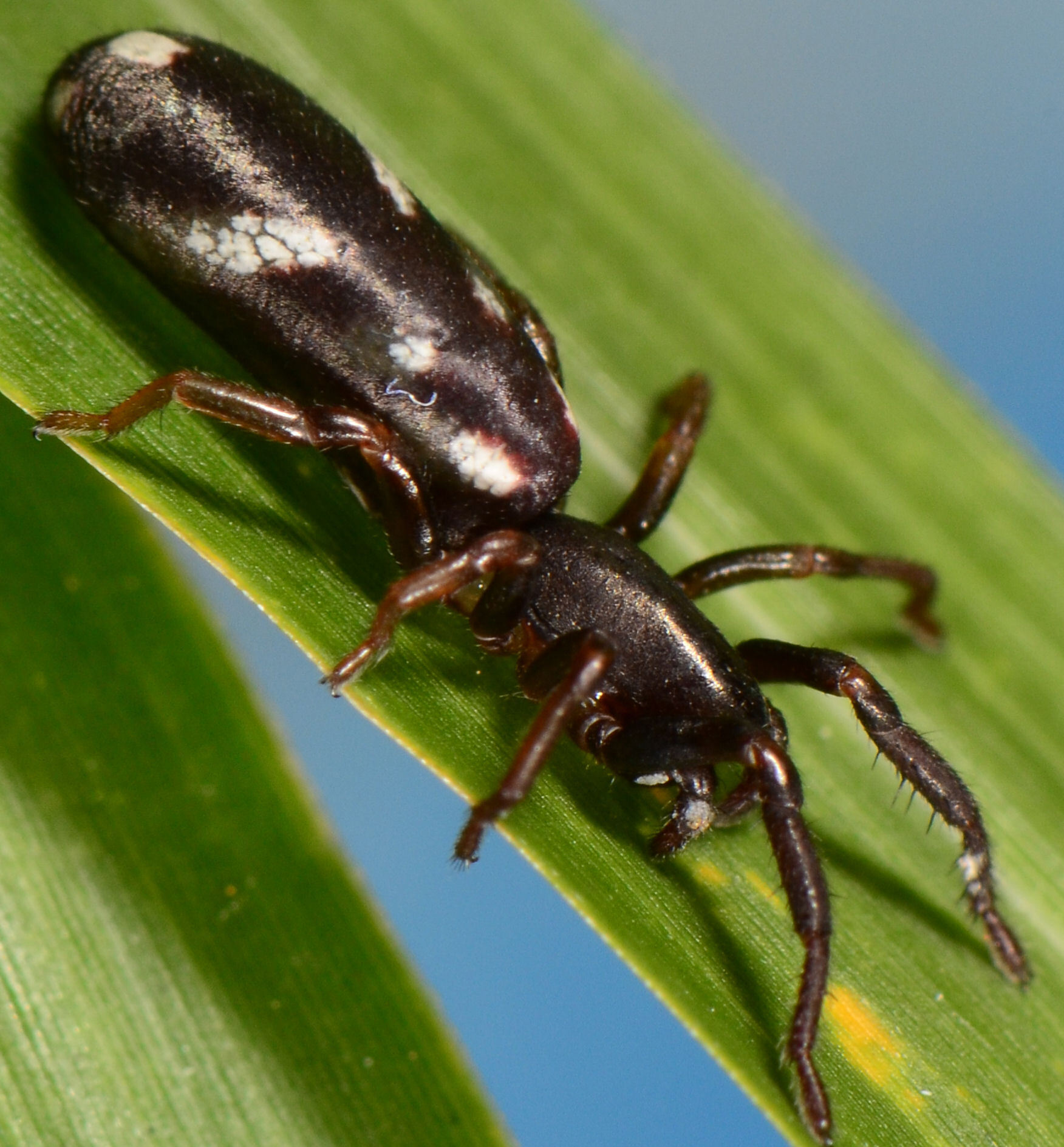
- Female C. navigator
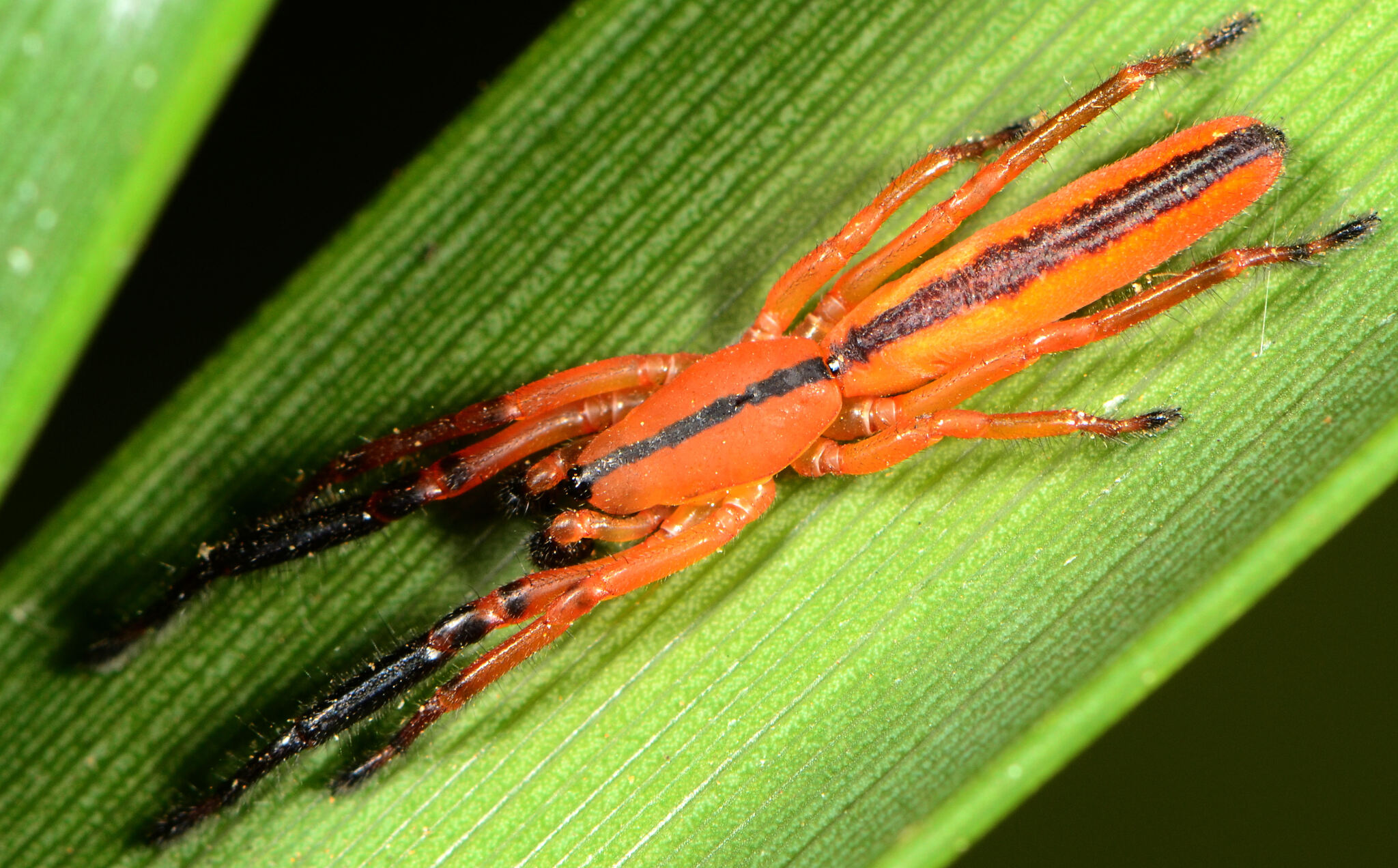
- Male C. lineatus

Scientific classification
- Kingdom: Animalia
- Phylum: Arthropoda
- Subphylum: Chelicerata
- Class: Arachnida
- Order: Araneae
- Infraorder: Araneomorphae
- Family: Zodariidae
- Genus: Chariobas; Simon

Type species
- Chariobas cylindraceus

Species
- 5, see text

= Chariobas =

Genus of spiders

Chariobas is an African genus of spiders in the family Zodariidae with five described species. It was first erected in 1893 by Eugène Simon.

== Distribution ==
All species are found in Africa from Ethiopia to West and southern Africa, with three species endemic to South Africa.

== Species ==
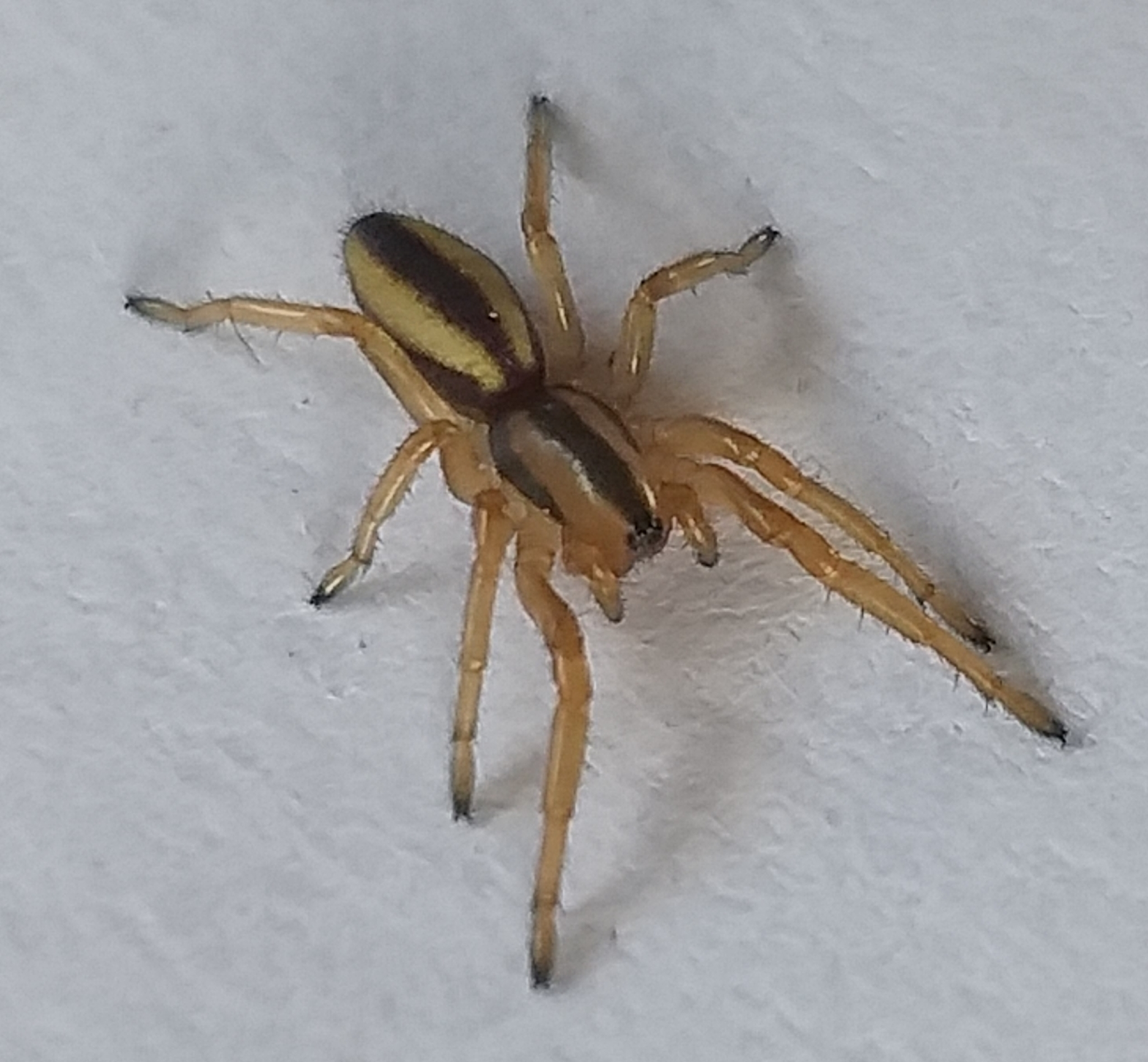
female C. lineatus

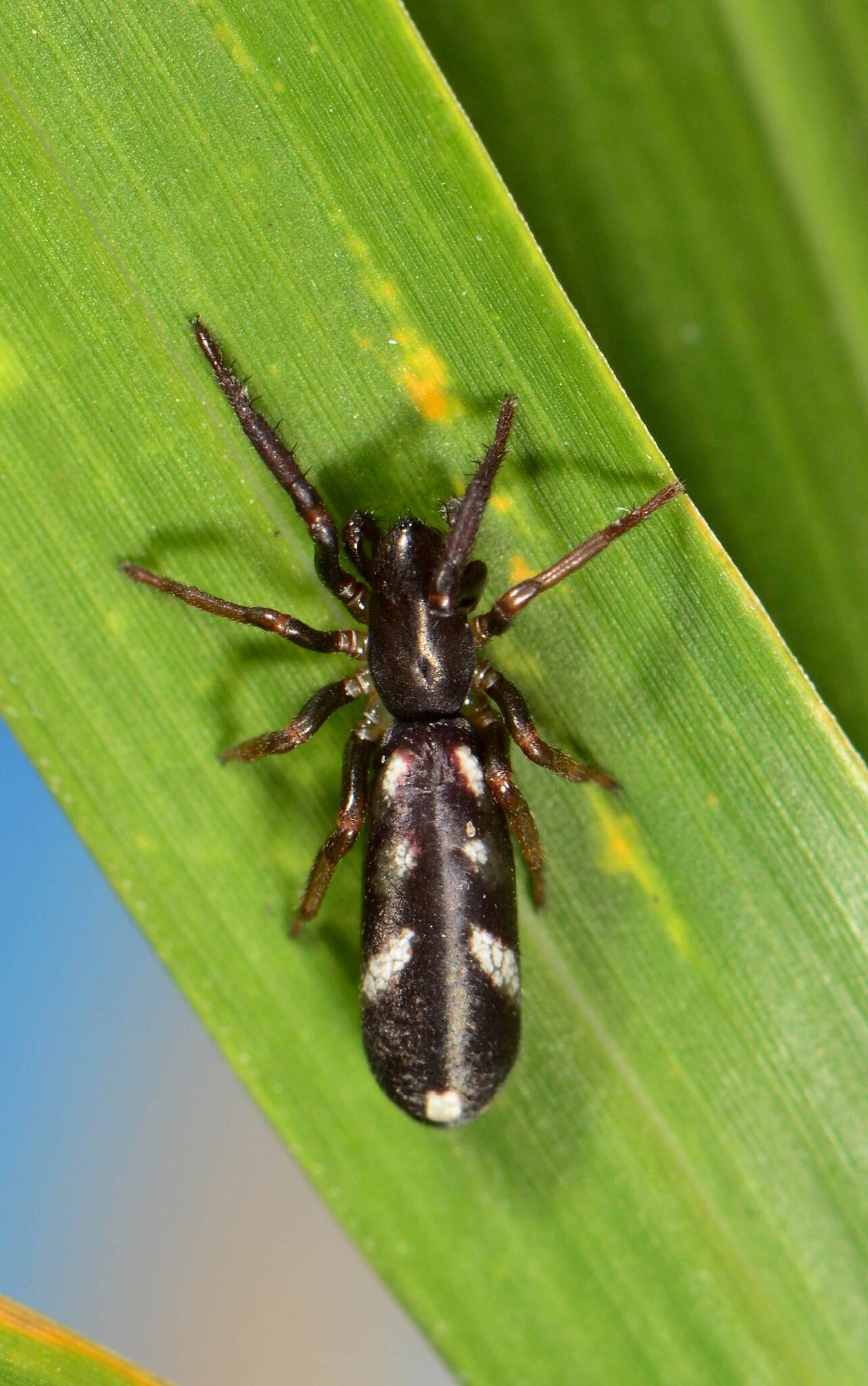
C. navigator

As of September 2025, this genus includes five species:

- Chariobas armatissimus Caporiacco, 1947 – Ethiopia
- Chariobas cylindraceus Simon, 1893 – Ivory Coast, Gabon, Rep. Congo, Tanzania, Angola, South Africa (type species)
- Chariobas lineatus Pocock, 1900 – South Africa
- Chariobas mamillatus Strand, 1909 – South Africa
- Chariobas navigator Strand, 1909 – South Africa
