= Chariobas cylindraceus =

Spotted Chariobas Grass-Stitching spider

Conservation status
- Least Concern (SANBI Red List)

Scientific classification
- Kingdom: Animalia
- Phylum: Arthropoda
- Subphylum: Chelicerata
- Class: Arachnida
- Order: Araneae
- Infraorder: Araneomorphae
- Family: Zodariidae
- Genus: Chariobas
- Species: C. cylindraceus

Binomial name
- Chariobas cylindraceus Simon, 1893

Species of spider

Chariobas cylindraceus is a species of spider in the family Zodariidae. It is widely distributed across Africa and is commonly known as the Spotted Chariobas Grass-Stitching spider.

== Distribution ==
Chariobas cylindraceus occurs in six African countries: Republic of the Congo, Gabon, Ivory Coast, Tanzania, Angola, and South Africa. In South Africa, it has been recorded from five provinces at elevations ranging from 6 to 1428 m above sea level.

== Habitat ==
The species is typically associated with grasses and sedges but is also sampled by beating low shrubs. It has been found across multiple biomes including Fynbos, Grassland, and Savanna.

== Description ==
Both males and females are known for this species. Females measure 8–9 mm in total length, while males are smaller at 6–7 mm. The carapace is brown with darker margins and is finely granulated. The legs are orange-brown. The opisthosoma is grey with 4 or 6 white or cream patches. Males are typically darker than females.

== Ecology ==
Like other species in this genus, Chariobas cylindraceus is commonly known as a grass stitcher due to its habit of spinning a silk retreat between several stems of grass. With their elongated bodies, they easily fit into these round narrow retreats. The eggs are deposited in a thin transparent sac that fits neatly into the grass retreat. When the first spiderlings hatch, they are visible through the transparent egg sac.

== Conservation ==
The species is listed as Least Concern by the South African National Biodiversity Institute due to its wide geographical range across multiple African countries. It is conserved in eight protected areas throughout its South African range.
