= Chariobas mamillatus =

Scientific classification
- Kingdom: Animalia
- Phylum: Arthropoda
- Subphylum: Chelicerata
- Class: Arachnida
- Order: Araneae
- Infraorder: Araneomorphae
- Family: Zodariidae
- Genus: Chariobas
- Species: C. mamillatus

Binomial name
- Chariobas mamillatus Strand, 1909

Species of spider

Chariobas mamillatus is a species of spider in the family Zodariidae. It is endemic to the Western Cape province of South Africa.

== Distribution ==
Chariobas mamillatus is known only from Simon's Town in the Western Cape province of South Africa, at an elevation of 125 m above sea level.

== Habitat ==
The species is a free-living plant-dweller that inhabits grass which it stitches together to form tubes, with silk retreats constructed within these tubes. It has been sampled from the Fynbos biome.

== Description ==
The species is known only from a juvenile specimen. The cephalothorax has an indistinctly limited yellowish pattern from the chelicerae to the hind margin, and is blackish-brown with a black eye field. The mandibles and extremities are light ochre. The sternum has a broad blackish margin but is otherwise light brown. The maxillae are yellowish, and the labium is light brown. The opisthosoma is light brown with somewhat violet coloration. Both the back and belly have two white longitudinal stripes each.

== Conservation ==
The species is listed as Data Deficient by the South African National Biodiversity Institute due to lack of data and taxonomic uncertainty. The species is known only from the type locality, and its status remains obscure. More sampling is needed to collect adult specimens and determine the species' range.
