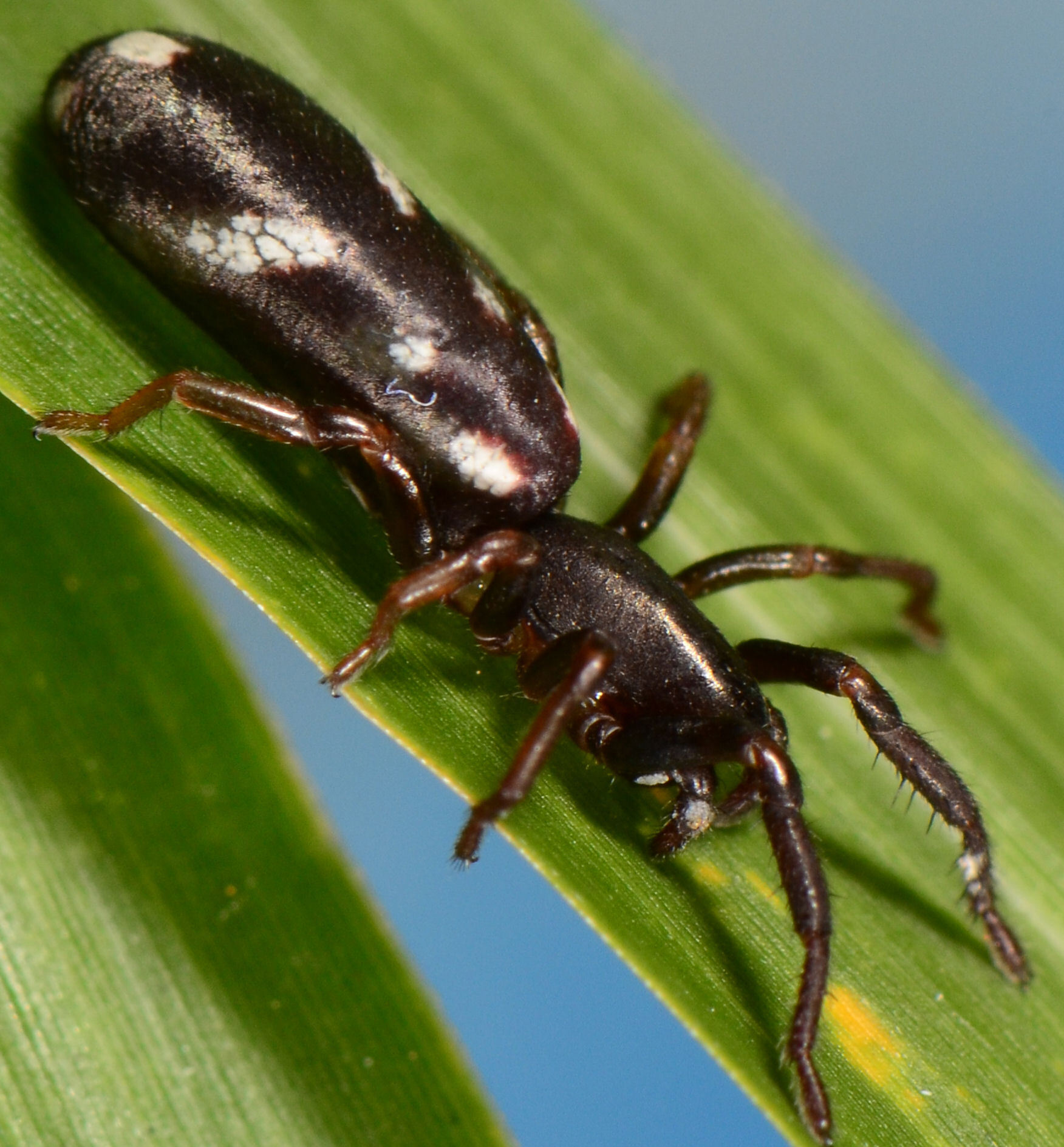
- Female
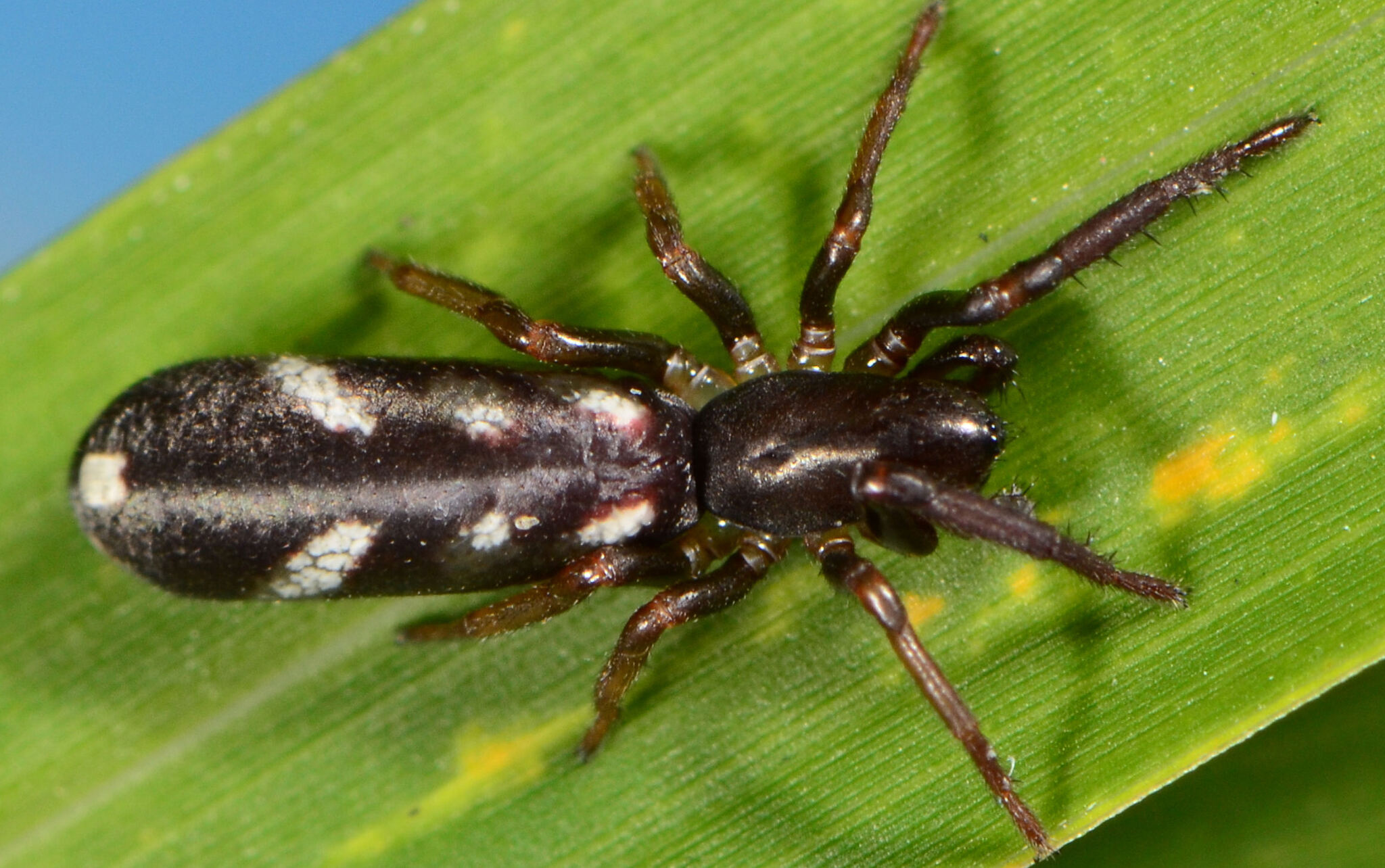
- Female

Scientific classification
- Kingdom: Animalia
- Phylum: Arthropoda
- Subphylum: Chelicerata
- Class: Arachnida
- Order: Araneae
- Infraorder: Araneomorphae
- Family: Zodariidae
- Genus: Chariobas
- Species: C. navigator

Binomial name
- Chariobas navigator Strand, 1909

= Chariobas navigator =

Cape Chariobas Grass-Stitching Spider

Species of spider

Chariobas navigator is a species of spider in the family Zodariidae. It is endemic to the Western Cape province of South Africa and is commonly known as the Cape Chariobas Grass-Stitching Spider.

== Distribution ==
Chariobas navigator is found in the Western Cape province of South Africa. It was originally described from Simon's Town and has also been recorded from Gondwana Private Game Reserve, at an elevation of 125 m above sea level.

== Habitat ==
The species is a free-living plant-dweller that inhabits grass which it stitches together to form tubes. It has been sampled from the Fynbos biome.

== Description ==
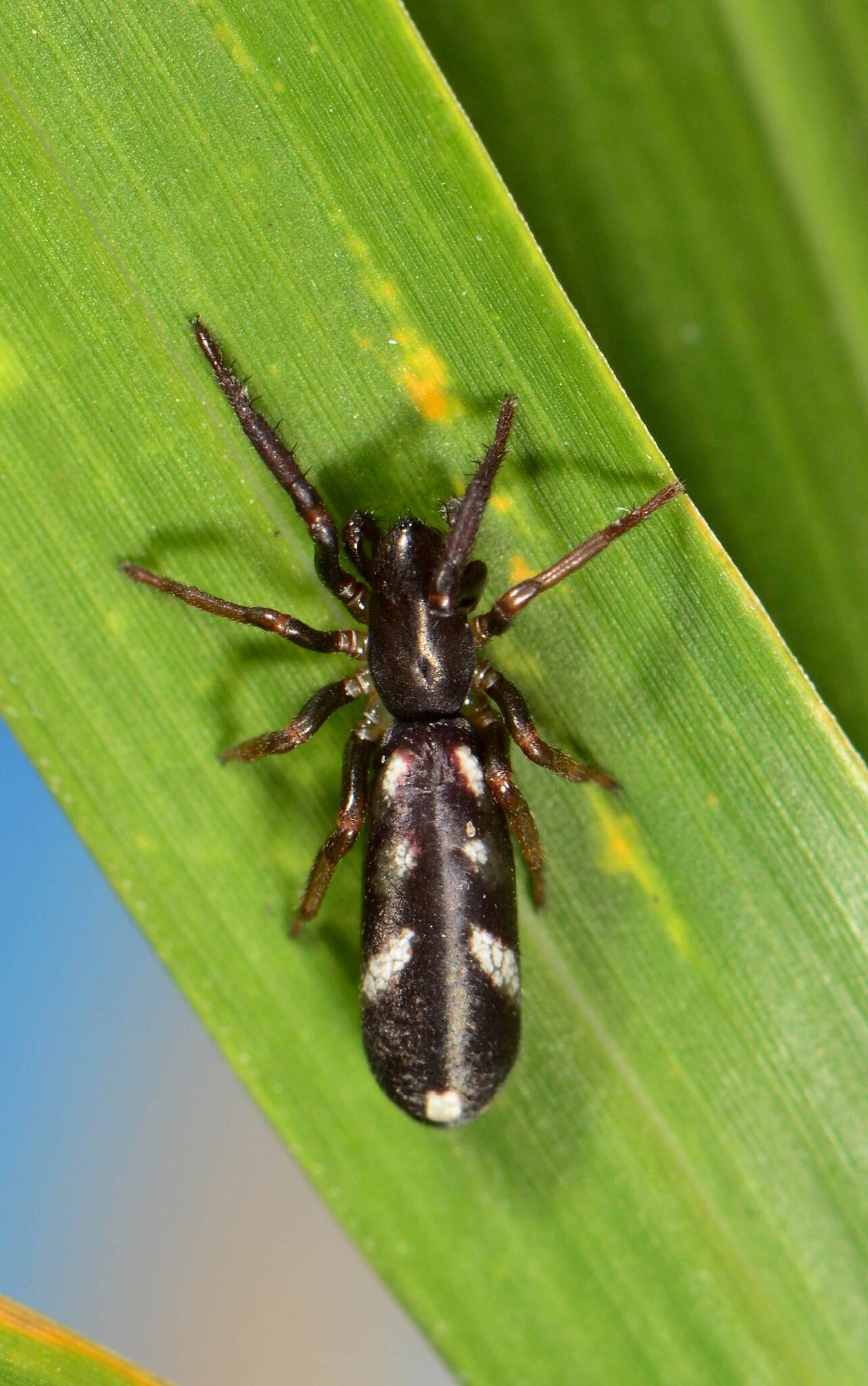
Female

The species is known only from juvenile specimens. The opisthosoma is black or brown-black, finely and indistinctly lighter punctuated. The back field has 4 pairs of whitish, rearwardly diverging oblique spots. The first pair are narrow elliptical and more than their width apart, the second larger, long triangular and somewhat closer together, the third the smallest, very narrow, strongly oblique, more than their length apart and somewhat blurred, and the fourth less oblique, in the middle almost or completely touching.

== Conservation ==
The species is listed as Data Deficient by the South African National Biodiversity Institute due to lack of data and taxonomic uncertainty. The status of the species remains obscure, and more sampling is needed to collect adult specimens and determine the species' range.
