= Polysteganus coeruleopunctatus =

Conservation status
- Data Deficient (IUCN 3.1)

Scientific classification
- Kingdom: Animalia
- Phylum: Chordata
- Class: Actinopterygii
- Order: Acanthuriformes
- Family: Sparidae
- Genus: Polysteganus
- Species: P. coeruleopunctatus

Binomial name
- Polysteganus coeruleopunctatus (Klunzinger, 1870)

Synonyms
- Dentex coeruleopunctatus Klunzinger, 1870

Species of fish

Polysteganus coeruleopunctatus, the blueskin seabream, blueskin or trawl soldier, is a species of marine ray-finned fish belonging to the family Sparidae, which includes the seabreams and porgies. This species is endemic to the western Indian Ocean. This species has increased in importance as a target for fisheries as other more accessible fish stocks are overexploited.

== Taxonomy ==
Polysteganus coeruleopunctatus was first formally described as Dentex (Polysteganus) coeruleopunctatus in 1870 by the German zoologist Carl Benjamin Klunzinger with its type locality given as Al-Qusair in the Red Sea Governorate of Egypt. In 1919 David Starr Jordan formally designated D. (P.) coeruleopunctatus as the type species of Polysteganus. The genus Polysteganus is placed in the family Sparidae within the order Spariformes by the 5th edition of Fishes of the World. Some authorities classify this genus in the subfamily Denticinae, but the 5th edition of Fishes of the World does not recognise subfamilies within the Sparidae.

== Etymology ==
Polysteganus coeruleopunctatus belongs to the genus Polysteganus and this name is a combination of poly, meaning "many", and steganus, meaning "covered", a reference to the scales between the eyes extend as far as a level with the front edge of the eyes. Its specific name coeruleopunctatus, which means "blue-spotted", an allusion to the blue spot on each scale on the upper half of the body, these create blue lines along each row of scales.

== Description ==
Polysteganus coeruleopunctatus Has a deep body which has a depth that fits into its standard length 2.2 or 2.3 times and is greater than the length of the head. The dorsal profile of the head is smooth with a small hump in front of the eyes. The pectoral fins are longer than the head. The dorsal fin is supported by 12 spines and 10 soft rays while there are 3 spines and 8 soft rays supporting the anal fin. As is typical for Polysteganus the canine-like teeth in the upper jaw are not well developed. The upper body is rosy in colour, the lower body is silvery. The scales on the upper body each have a blue spot and these form blue lines along the scale rows. This species has a maximum published total length of 60 cm (24 in), but 35 cm (14 in) is more typical.

== Distribution and habitat ==
Polysteganus coeruleopunctatus Is found in the Western Indian Ocean from the Red Sea south to Transkei in South Africa, including Socotra and Madagascar. it is a deep water species found between 50 and 450 m (160 and 1,480 ft) around reefs.

== Biology ==
Polysteganus coeruleopunctatus adults feed largely on crustaceans and are found in deeper waters, 60 to 405 m (197 to 1,329 ft), while juveniles are found between 60 and 100 m (200 and 330 ft). This species is a protogynous hermaphrodite with the females reaching sexual maturity at a fork length of 20 to 22.7 cm (7.9 to 8.9 in) and an age between 2.7 and 6 years. The largest fishes are mostly males.

== Fisheries and conservation ==
Polysteganus coeruleopunctatus is an increasingly important target species for fisheries in South Africa, Mozambique and Madagascar, with most of the fish landed being exported to Europe. There is some evidence that some stocks in these countries' waters are being overfished and there is a need for assessments of the stock as few ladinfpg statistics are available. Given its wide range and deepwater, rocky habitat the species is not considered globally threatened. This species does, however, have life history characteristics which make it vulnerable to overfishing. The lack of data on stock and landings and rge life history characteristics have led the International Union for Conservation of Nature to classify this species as Data deficient.
