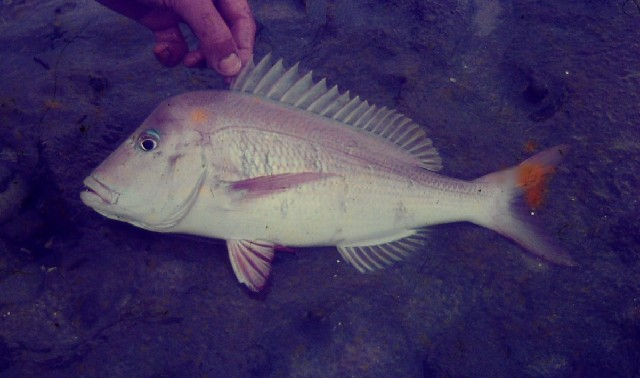
- Polysteganus praeorbitalis

Scientific classification
- Kingdom: Animalia
- Phylum: Chordata
- Class: Actinopterygii
- Order: Acanthuriformes
- Family: Sparidae
- Genus: Polysteganus; Klunzinger, 1870

Type species
- Dentex (Polysteganus) coeruleopunctatus Klunzinger, 1870

Synonyms
- Axineceps J. L. B. Smith, 1938

= Polysteganus =

Genus of fishes in the family Sparidae

Polysteganus is a genus of ray-finned fish belonging to the family Sparidae, which includes the seabreams and porgies. The fishes in this genus are found in the Indian Ocean.

== Taxonomy ==
Polysteganus was first proposed as a subgenus of Dentex in 1870 by the German zoologist Carl Benjamin Klunzinger when he described Dentex (Polysteganus) coeruleopunctatus. In 1919 David Starr Jordan formally designated D. (P.) coeruleopunctatus as the type species of Polysteganus. This genus is placed in the family Sparidae within the order Spariformes by the 5th edition of Fishes of the World. Some authorities classify this genus in the subfamily Denticinae, but the 5th edition of Fishes of the World does not recognise subfamilies within the Sparidae.

== Etymology ==
Polysteganus is a combination of poly, meaning "many", and steganus, meaning "covered", a reference to the scales between the eyes extend as far as a level with the front edge of the eyes.

== Species ==
Polysteganus contains 8 recognised species:

- Polysteganus baissaci M. M. Smith, 1978 (Frenchman seabream)
- Polystaganus cerasinus Yukio Iwatsuki & Heemstra, 2015 (Cherry seabream)
- Polysteganus coeruleopunctatus (Klunzinger, 1870) (blue-skin seabream)
- Polysteganus flavodorsalis Iwatsuki & Heemstra, 2015 (Yellow seabream)
- Polysteganus lineopunctatus (Boulenger, 1903) (Bluespotted seabream)
- Polysteganus mascarenensis Iwatsuki & Heemstra, 2011 (Mascarene red seabream)
- Polysteganus praeorbitalis (Günther, 1859) (Scotsman seabream)
- Polysteganus undulosus (Regan, 1908) (seventy-four seabream)

== Characteristics ==
Polysteganus seabreams typically have 12, although it is sometimes 11, spines supporting the dorsal fin. The space between the eyes and the flange of the preoperculum are scaly while the bases of the dorsal and anal fin are not fleshy. The canine-like teeth in the front of the jaws, 6 on the lower jaw and 4 on the upper jaw, are not well developed, although in P. baissaci each jaw has 4 canines at its front. The lower jaw has no molar-like teeth. The seventyfour seabream (P. undulosus) is the largest species in the genus with a maximum published total length of 120 cm (47 in) while, with a maximum published total length of 13.4 cm (5.3 in), the cherry seabream (P. cerasinus) is the smallest.

== Distribution and habitat ==
Polysteganus seabreams are only found in the Western Indian Ocean from the Red Sea south to as far as Knysna in the Western Cape and around Madagascar, the Seychelles and the Mascarene Islands. They live at depths greater than 50 m (160 ft) over sandy substrates and reefs.

== Fisheries ==
Polysteganus has one species, P. coeruleopunctatus, which is a commercially important species in East Africa. Another species P. undulosus, which has been overfished in South Africa where a moratorium on fishing was put in place and since then there has been some indication of a recovery in the stocks, such as increased numbers of juveniles being seen in nursery areas.
