= Polysteganus undulosus =

Conservation status
- Endangered (IUCN 3.1)

Scientific classification
- Kingdom: Animalia
- Phylum: Chordata
- Class: Actinopterygii
- Division: Teleostei
- Order: Acanthuriformes
- Family: Sparidae
- Genus: Polysteganus
- Species: P. undulosus

Binomial name
- Polysteganus undulosus (Regan, 1908)

Synonyms
- Dentex undulosus Regan, 1908

Species of fish

Polysteganus undulosus, the seventyfour seabream, is a species of marine ray-finned fish belonging to the family Sparidae, which includes the seabreams and porgies. This species is endemic to the southwestern Indian Ocean off Southern Africa.

== Taxonomy ==
Polysteganus undulosus was first formally described as Dentex undulosus in 1908 by the English zoologist Charles Tate Regan with its type localities given as 16 miles northeast of Bird Island, KwaZulu-Natal, and Table Bay, Cape Colony, in South Africa. The genus Polysteganus is placed in the family Sparidae within the order Spariformes by the 5th edition of Fishes of the World. Some authorities classify this genus in the subfamily Denticinae, but the 5th edition of Fishes of the World does not recognise subfamilies within the Sparidae.

== Etymology ==
Polysteganus undulosus belongs to the genus Polysteganus and this name is a combination of poly, meaning " many", and steganus, meaning "covered", a reference to the scales between the eyes extend as far as a level with the front edge of the eyes. Its specific name undulosus, which means ""with undulating lines", a reference to the wavy light-edged dark horizontal stripes on the upper body.

== Description ==
Polysteganus undulosus has 12 spines and 10 soft rays supporting the dorsal fin while the anal fin is supported by 3 spines and 8 or 0 soft rays. It has a moderately deep body with the depth fitting into the standard length 2.4 to 2.9 times, with the older specimens being more elongate and less deep. The dorsal profile of the head is moderately steep up to the nape, with a prominent bump above the eyes in juveniles but this is lacking in adults. The pectoral fins are subequal to the length of the head in young specimens but longer than the head length in adults. The overall colour of the body is brilliant red, with many blue horizontal lines and a single yellow line running along the lateral line. There are blue lines along lips and the margin of the suborbital bone is blue. A large oval dark blotch is on the flanks underneath the spiny part of the dorsal fin. The anal fin is reddish with blue and yellow mottling and the caudal fin is also reddish. This species has a maximum published total length of 120 cm (47 in), but 80 cm (31 in) is more typical, and the maximum published weight is 16 kg (35 lb).

== Distribution and habitat ==
Polysteganus undulosus is endemic to the southwestern Indian Ocean off Southern Africa from southern Mozambique to Knysna in the Western Cape, South Africa. This species is found at depths between 40 and 160 m (130 and 520 ft) with the adults being found over deep water reefs and pinnacles in offshore waters while the juveniles are found in shallower offshore reefs but still at depths greater than 20 m (66 ft).

== Biology ==
Polysteganus undulosus is a predtory species with the adults preying mainly on fish, especially sardines and mackerels, such as Sardinops sagax and Scomber japonicus, but they will also prey on smaller reef fishes, cephalopods and crustaceans. The juveniles feed mainly on mysids, as well as other invertebrates. Seventyfour seabream aggregate in dense shoals over pinnacles. The juveniles are largely resident but the adults migrate norteaths from the southern coast of South Africa north to the eastern coast in the winter months to spawn. This migration may also be the fishes following the annual migration of S. sagax. It is thought that the seventyfour seanream may live for longer than 20 years.

This species is a rudimentary hermaphrodite, i.e. the gonads contain both male and female tissue, and functional gonochorist, they do not change sex. Most individuals attain sexual maturity at around 8.8 years old in both sexes with the earliest mature fish being observed from 4–5 years old. The length that most fish reach sexual maturity is between 65 and 75 cm (26 and 30 in). The seventyfour seabream spawns between July and November, peaking between August and October. During spawning the adults aggregate over offshore reefs between 50 and 100 m (160 and 330 ft) in depth off the eastern coast of South Africa in KwaZulu-Natal and the Transkei Each female bears between 1,000,000 and 3,000,000 eggs. After spawning the pelagic eggs are believed to drift south on the shore side of the Agulhas Current, although in 25 years of sampling o eggs have been found off Park Rynie in southern KwaZulu-Natal.

== Fisheries and conservation ==
Polysteganus undulosus was severely overfished in the 20th century, the species displays life history characteristics which make it vulnerable to overfishing, slow growth, late sexual maturity and predictable mass spawning aggregations. In the 1960s the seventyfour seabream stock collapsed and its distribution contracted. This led to strict regulations on fisheries being put in place but the stock did not recover so in 1998 a 10-year moratorium on fisheries was put in place and in 2007 a stock assessment found that there had been a small recovery in the stock. It was then decided to extend the moratorium for a further 5 years. In addition, the creation of no take Marine protected areas is likely to have aided the species recovery, especially the Pondoland Marine Protected Area. Despite this the blackmarket price for seventyfour seabream remains high and this incentivises illegal fishing. The amount landed declined from more than 1,000 t (980 long tons; 1,100 short tons) in the early 1900s to 400 t (390 long tons; 440 short tons), or less, in the 1920s and 1930s and to 5.4 t (5.3 long tons; 6.0 short tons) by the 1980s. The moratorium was extended to 2013 and the status of the stock needs to be re-evaluated. Juvenile P, undulosus have been reported to be increasingly common in the waters between the mouth of the Kei and East London), so much so that fishermen report being unable to catch any other species of reef fish due to the dominance of this species. This appears to be evidence that the conservation measure put in place have been successful and that the population is recovering. The International Union for Conservation of Nature classify P, undulosus as Critically Endangered.
