= South African Association for Marine Biological Research =

Non profit conservation research organisation based in Durban, SA

South African Association for Marine Biology
- Abbreviation: SAAMBR
- Formation: 1951; 75 years ago
- Type: Advocacy NGO, non profit
- Purpose: Marine biological and conservation research in the Western Indian Ocean
- Locations: 1 King Shaka Avenue, Durban 4001; KwaZulu-Natal South Africa
- Website: www.saambr.org.za

The South African Association for Marine Biological Research (SAAMBR), is a non-government, non profit company and public benefit organisation which contributes to the conservation of marine and coastal resources in the Western Indian Ocean, founded in 1951.

== Organisation ==
SAAMBR has three divisions:

- The Oceanographic Research Institute (ORI) – Marine scientific investigation and management advice, largely of an applied and problem solving nature, training and capacity building, and consulting.
- uShaka Marine World – Aquarium theme park, marine animal rescue & rehabilitation.
- uShaka Sea World Education – Guided educational tours for school groups and short educational courses by prior arrangement through educational establishments.

== History ==
The South African Association for Marine Biological Research (SAAMBR) was established in 1951 by a group of conservationists, academics and fishermen who were concerned about the future of marine conservation in South Africa. From 1959 the organisation was housed in the Durban Centenary Aquarium, with laboratories and a library. The Dolphinarium was opened in 1976, and in 2004, SAAMBR moved to premises at uShaka Marine World.

== Funding ==
SAAMBR is funded by KwaZulu-Natal provincial government for services in the maritime province of KwaZulu-Natal. It is also partially funded by the World Bank Group.
