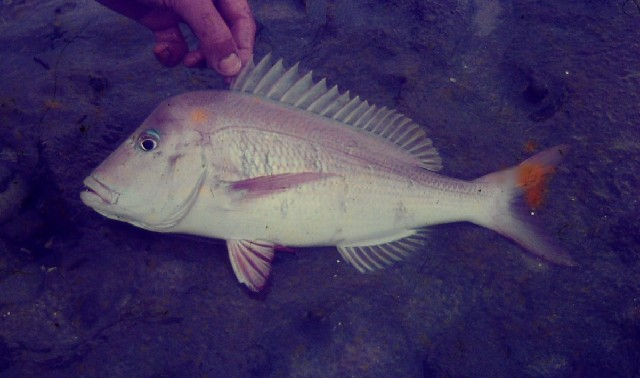

Conservation status
- Vulnerable (IUCN 3.1)

Scientific classification
- Kingdom: Animalia
- Phylum: Chordata
- Class: Actinopterygii
- Order: Acanthuriformes
- Family: Sparidae
- Genus: Polysteganus
- Species: P. praeorbitalis

Binomial name
- Polysteganus praeorbitalis (Günther, 1859)

Synonyms
- Dentex praeorbitalis Günther, 1859

= Polysteganus praeorbitalis =

"Scotsman" seabream, a fish endemic to the Southern African east coast

Polysteganus praeorbitalis, the Scotsman or Scotsman seabream, is a species of marine fish in the seabream family (Sparidae) of order Perciformes. It is native to Southern Africa.

== Description ==
The species exhibits an oblong, robust, and slightly compressed body, featuring a single continuous dorsal fin and a slightly forked caudal fin. Characterized by its distinctive body shape, it is easily recognizable. Notably, adults present a steep forehead and a prominent nape hump, while the body gradually tapers towards the tail. Additionally, the species possesses small eyes.

Adults typically display hues ranging from reddish-pink to pale blue-green, adorned with numerous blue dots on the upper body and pearly scales beneath the lateral line. Additionally, silvery to blue lines are often observed around the eyes. In contrast, juveniles may exhibit a more yellowish coloration and three brown longitudinal stripes.

The species attains at most 90 cm (35 in) in length, and weighs 11 kg (24 lb). Its typical length is around 35.0 cm.

=== Diagnostics ===
The dorsal fin has 12 spines, followed by 10 soft rays. The anal fin has eight rays. The pectoral fin is subequal to the head, and the ventral fin has one spine and five rays. The lateral line has 59 to 66 scales. Some 15 or 16 gill rakers occur on the lower limb of the first gill arch. The standard length is 2.5 to 2.8 times the body depth, and 3.0 to 3.2 times the head length.

== Distribution and habitat ==
Distribution is from Algoa Bay in the Eastern Cape, South Africa to Beira, Mozambique; it is Southern African endemic. It inhabits offshore reefs between 15 and 120 m in depth. The maximum age recorded is 13 years, at a length of 72 cm, but it is believed to attain greater age based on size records.

== Diet ==
It feeds mainly on small reef fishes, but also on crustaceans and benthic cephalopods.

== Reproduction ==
The Scotsman matures around 40 cm in about 6 years, and aggregates for breeding and spawns off KwaZulu-Natal in winter, and possibly spring, mostly from Richard's Bay northwards. Normally solitary, Polysteganus praeorbitalis is thought to be a protogynous hermaphrodite, but this is not yet confirmed.

== Importance to humans ==
For commercial and recreational line fishery, the catch restricted. Numbers have decreased considerably due to overfishing.
