= Mkhambathi Nature Reserve =

Coastal nature reserve at Lusikisiki in the Eastern Cape, South Africa

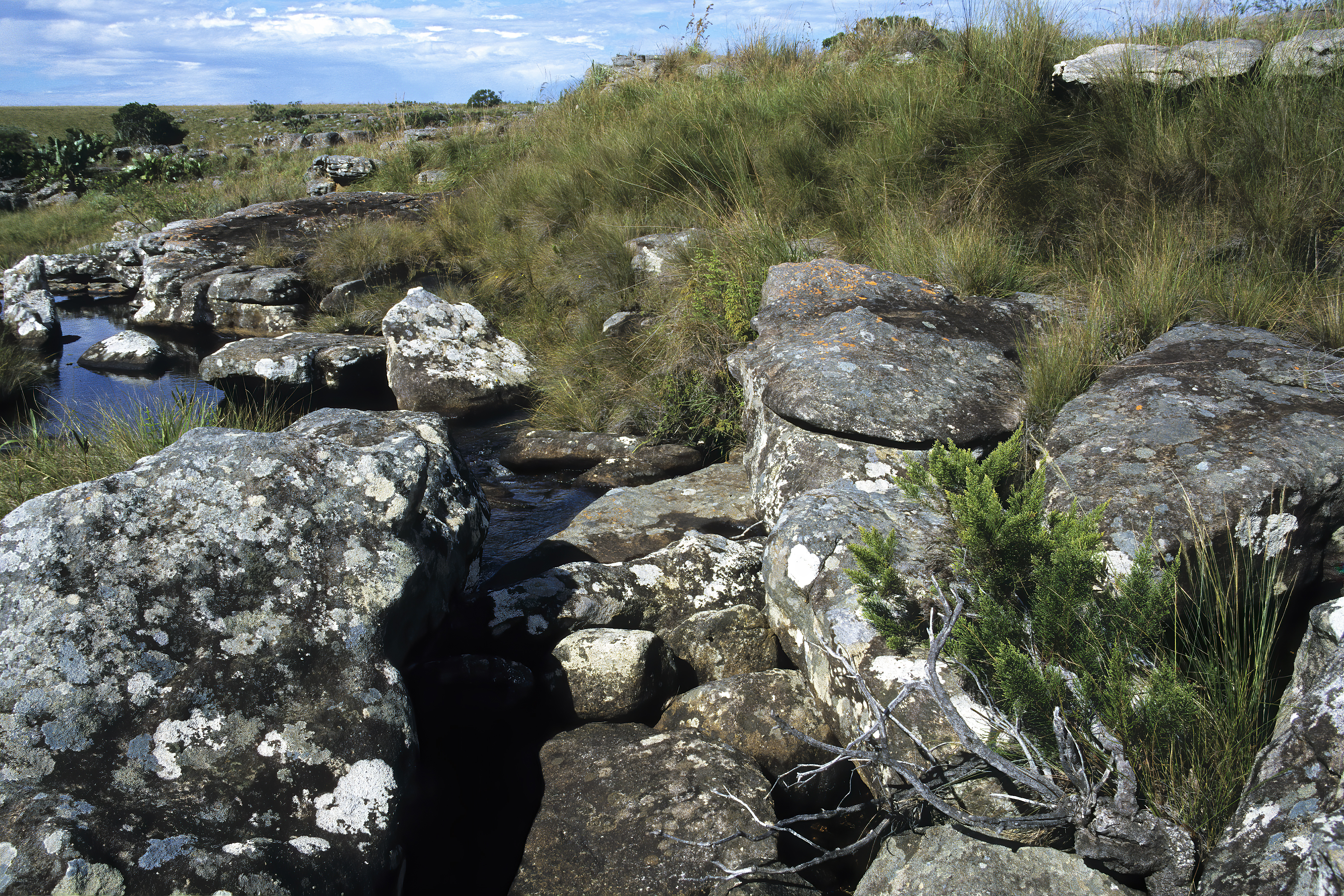
- Brunia trygyna, a species on the brink of extinction. Only remaining plant (front right) in the Mkhambathi Nature Reserve.
- Interactive map of Mkhambathi Nature Reserve
- Location: Lusikisiki, Eastern Cape, South Africa
- Nearest city: Flagstaff; Port Edward; Port St Johns
- Coordinates: 31°18′22″S 29°59′5″E
- Area: 7,720 hectares (19,100 acres)
- Established: 2009
- Website: Mkambati Nature Reserve - Wild Coast

Ramsar Wetland
- Official name: Mkambati Nature Reserve
- Designated: 2 February 2025
- Reference no.: 2554

The Pondoland Marine Protected Area, off the coast of the park

Mkhambathi Nature Reserve (or Mkambati Nature Reserve) is a protected area at Lusikisiki in the Eastern Cape, South Africa. It is 7,720 hectares (19,100 acres), with the Pondoland Marine Protected Area off its coastal edge. The reserve is located in the Pondoland Centre of Plant Endemism and the greater Maputaland–Pondoland–Albany Hotspot, and is covered in open grassland, dotted with patches of indigenous forest, swamp forests and flanked by the forested ravines of the Msikaba and Mtentu rivers. The Reserve was listed as a protected Ramsar site in 2025.

== Biodiversity ==
=== Amphibians ===
Amphibians occur in the coastal region of the reserve.

- Bush squeaker
- Forest tree frog
- Knysna leaf-folding frog
- Natal chirping frog
- Plaintive rain frog
- Yellow-striped reed frog

=== Birds ===
The reserve has a large colony (400–800 individuals) of Cape vulture (a threatened species).

- African finfoot
- African grass owl
- Black-bellied bustard
- Black-bellied starling
- Black-rumped buttonquail
- Black-winged lapwing
- Broad-tailed warbler
- Brown scrub robin
- Buff-streaked chat
- Cape cormorant
- Cape vulture
- Chorister robin-chat
- Corn crake
- Crowned eagle
- Denham's bustard
- Grey crowned crane
- Grey sunbird
- Gurney's sugarbird
- Half-collared kingfisher
- Knysna woodpecker
- Olive sunbird
- Southern ground hornbill
- Spotted ground thrush
- Striped flufftail
- Swamp nightjar
- White-backed night heron

=== Mammals ===
- Chacma baboon
- Black-backed jackal
- Bushbuck
- Eland
- Southern reedbuck
- Common duiker
- Zulu golden mole
- Forest shrew
- Least dwarf shrew

=== Reptiles ===
- Natal black snake
- Southern brown egg eater
- Variable legless skink

=== Vegetation ===
There is an abundance of endemic plants found in the Pondoland landscape of the reserve, including the endemic false water-berry, Rhynchocalyx lawsonioides. The Pondo palm is only found in this region, growing along the banks of the Msikaba and Mtentu rivers. Gurney's sugarbird can be found in protea bushes. Broad-tailed warblers can be found in marshland.

== Threats ==
The endemic plants in the reserve face threats from fire as a consequence of poaching game, and of pervading invasive alien plants like:

- Black wattle
- Guava
- Tickberry
- Triffid weed

== Gallery ==
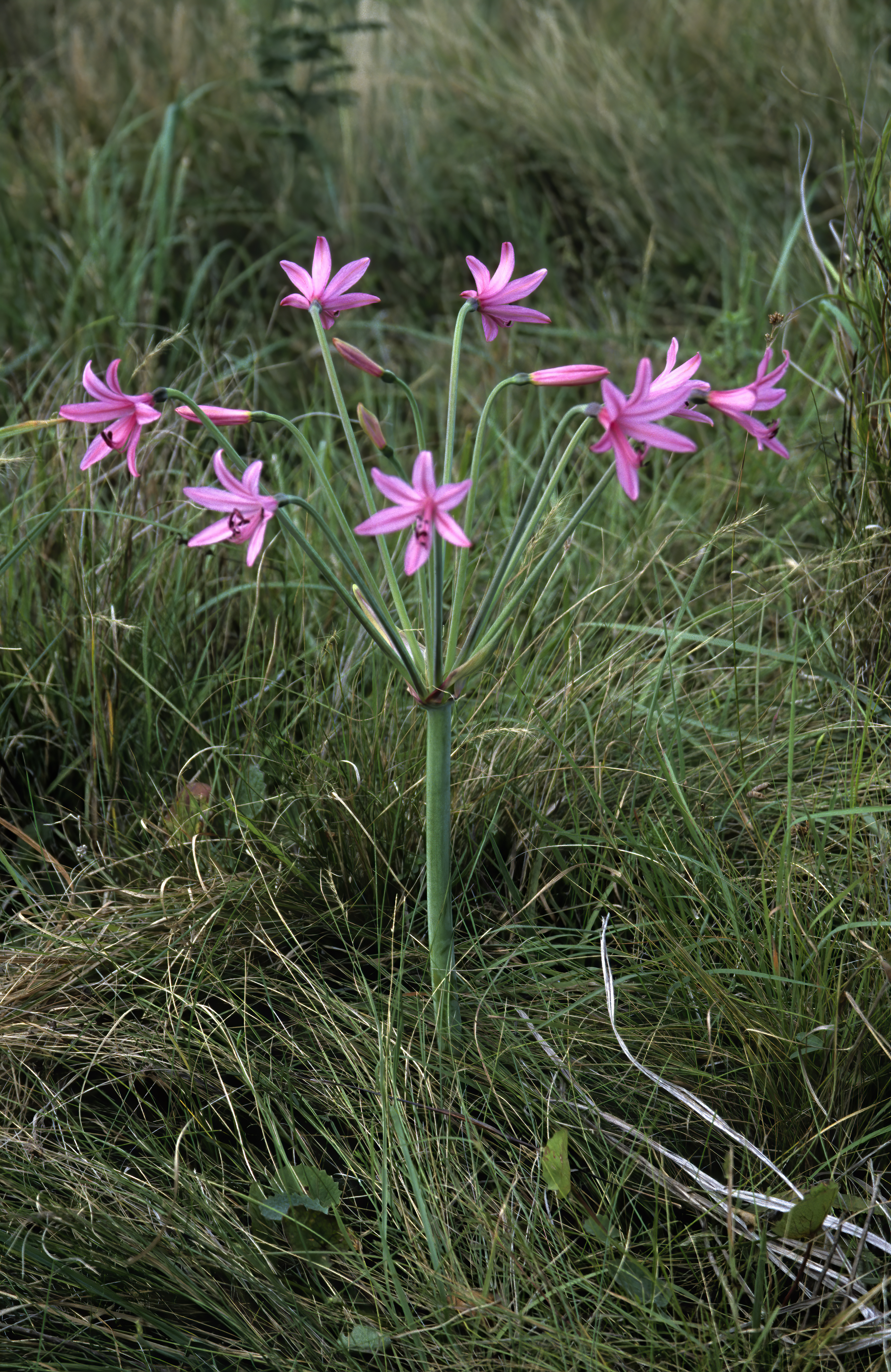
Brunsvigia grandiflora

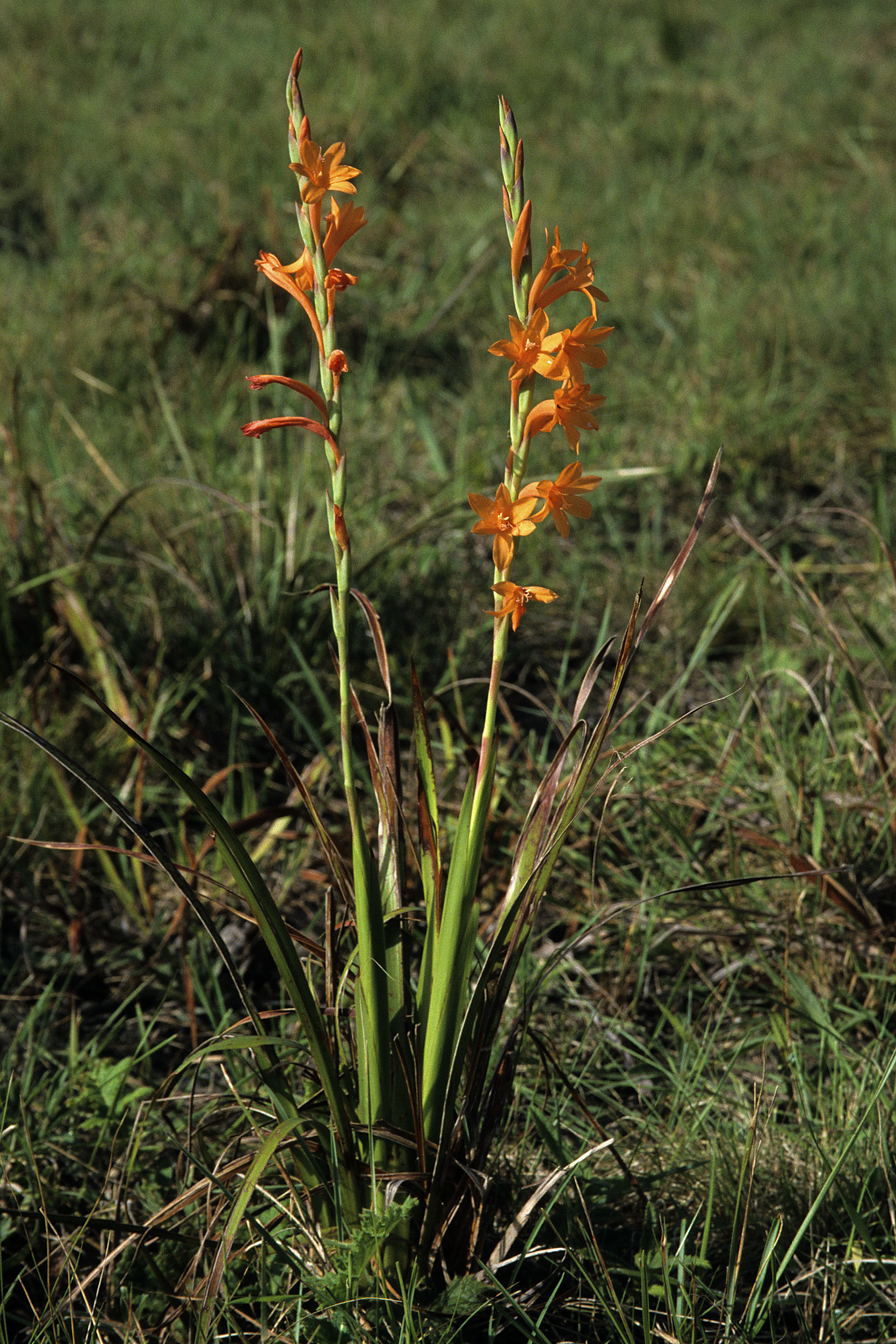
Watsonia pillansii

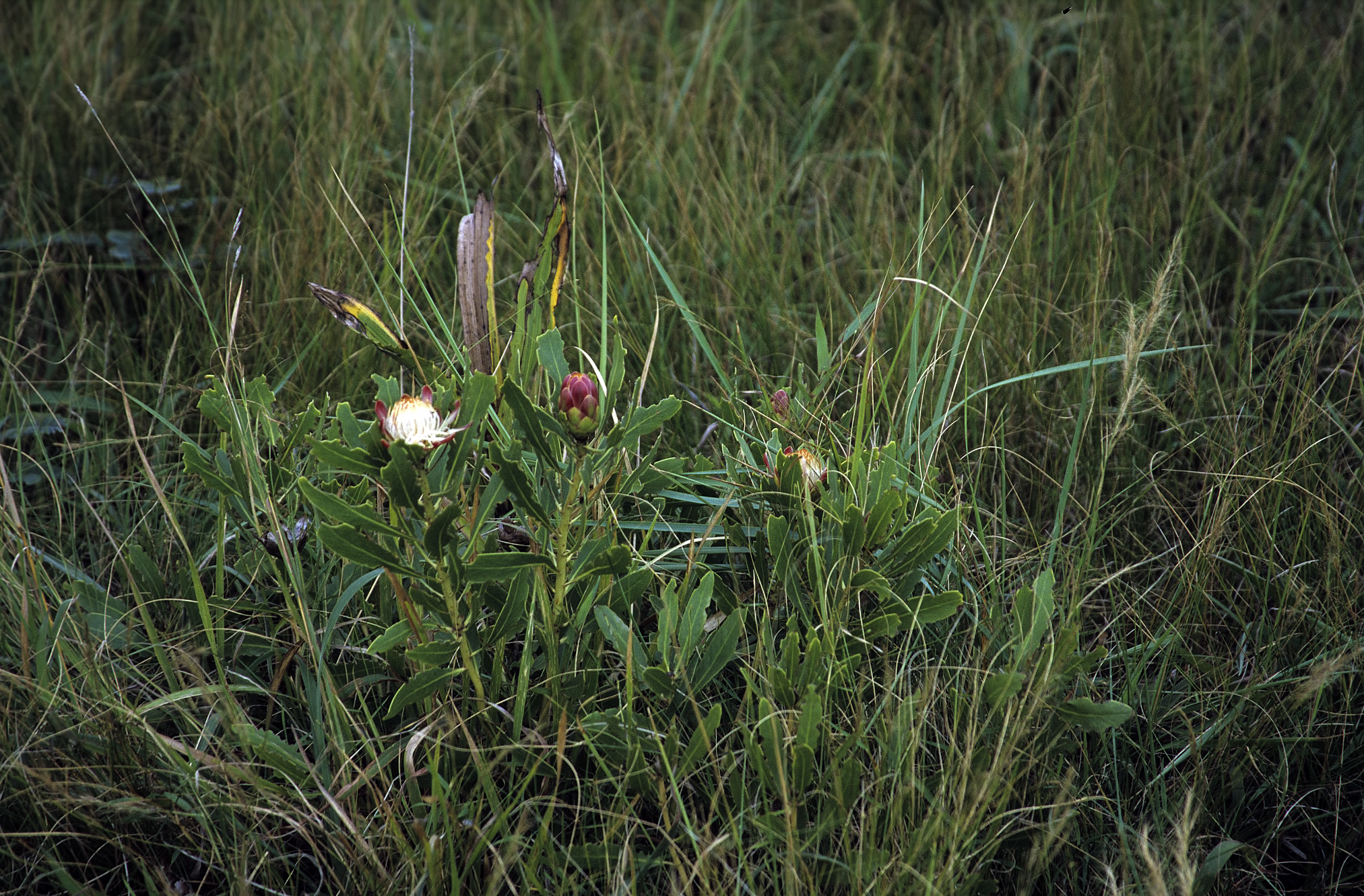
Protea afra

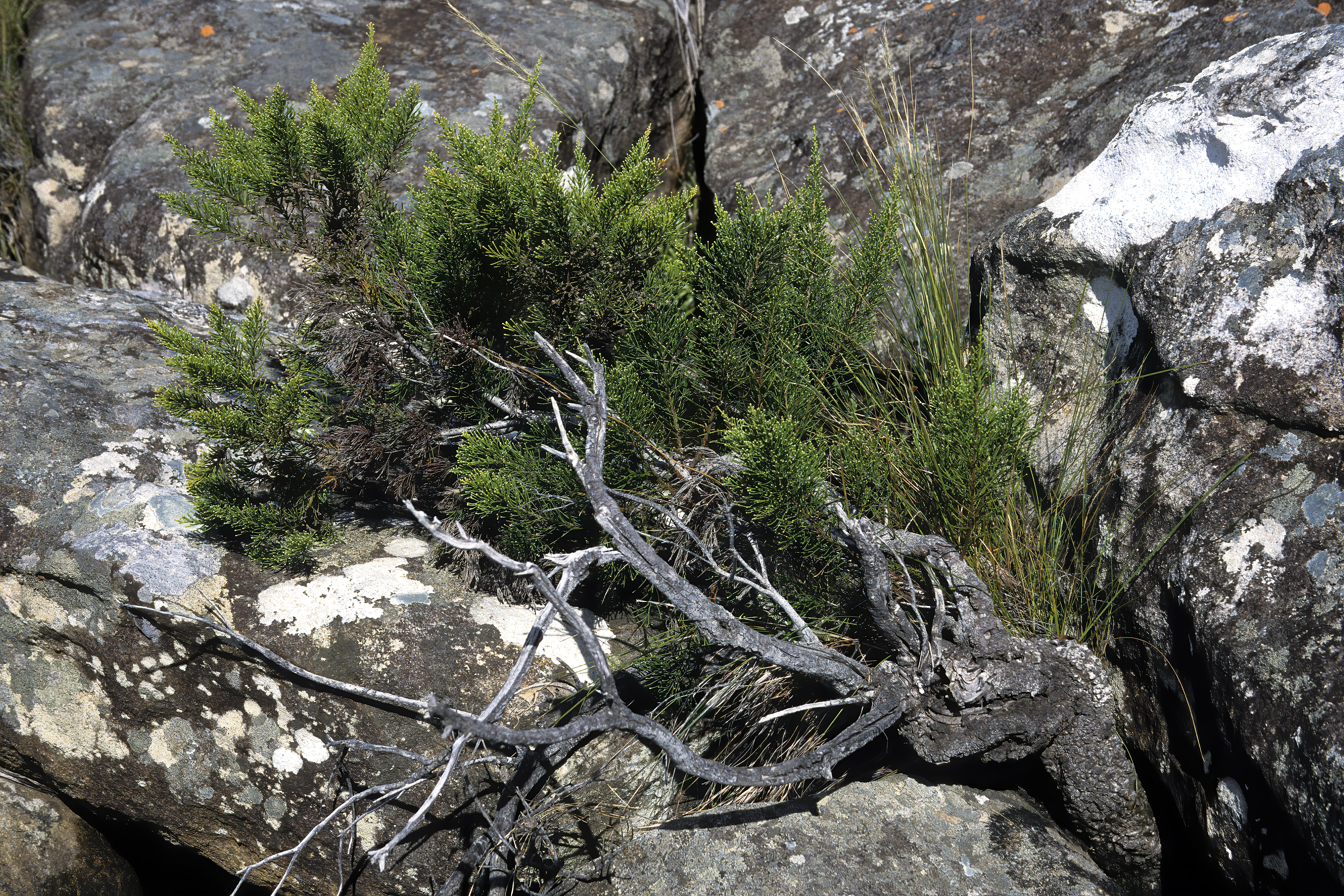
Brunia trygyna. A species on the brink of extinction. The only remaining plant in the Mkhambathi Nature Reserve.

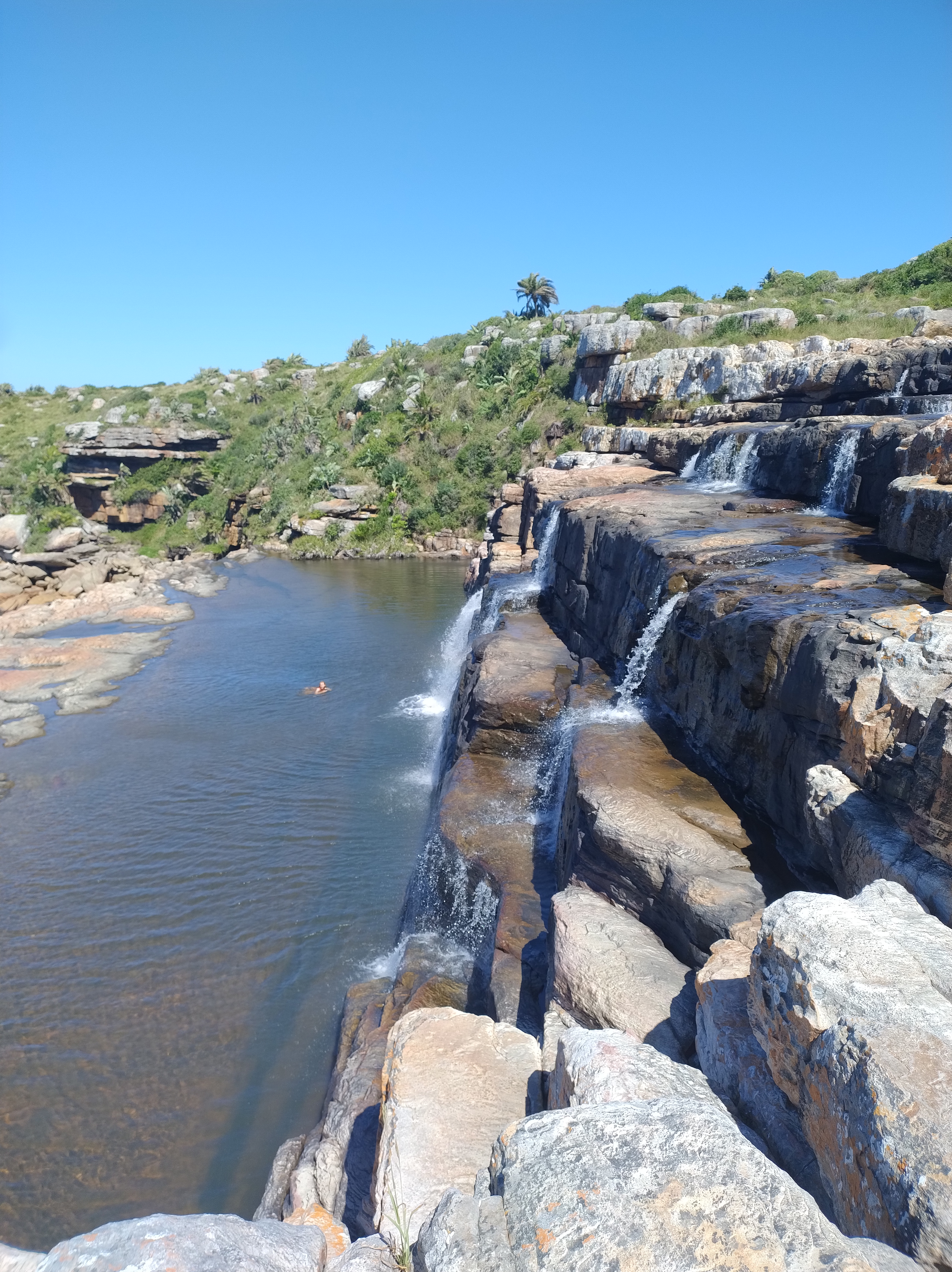
Mkambati Falls

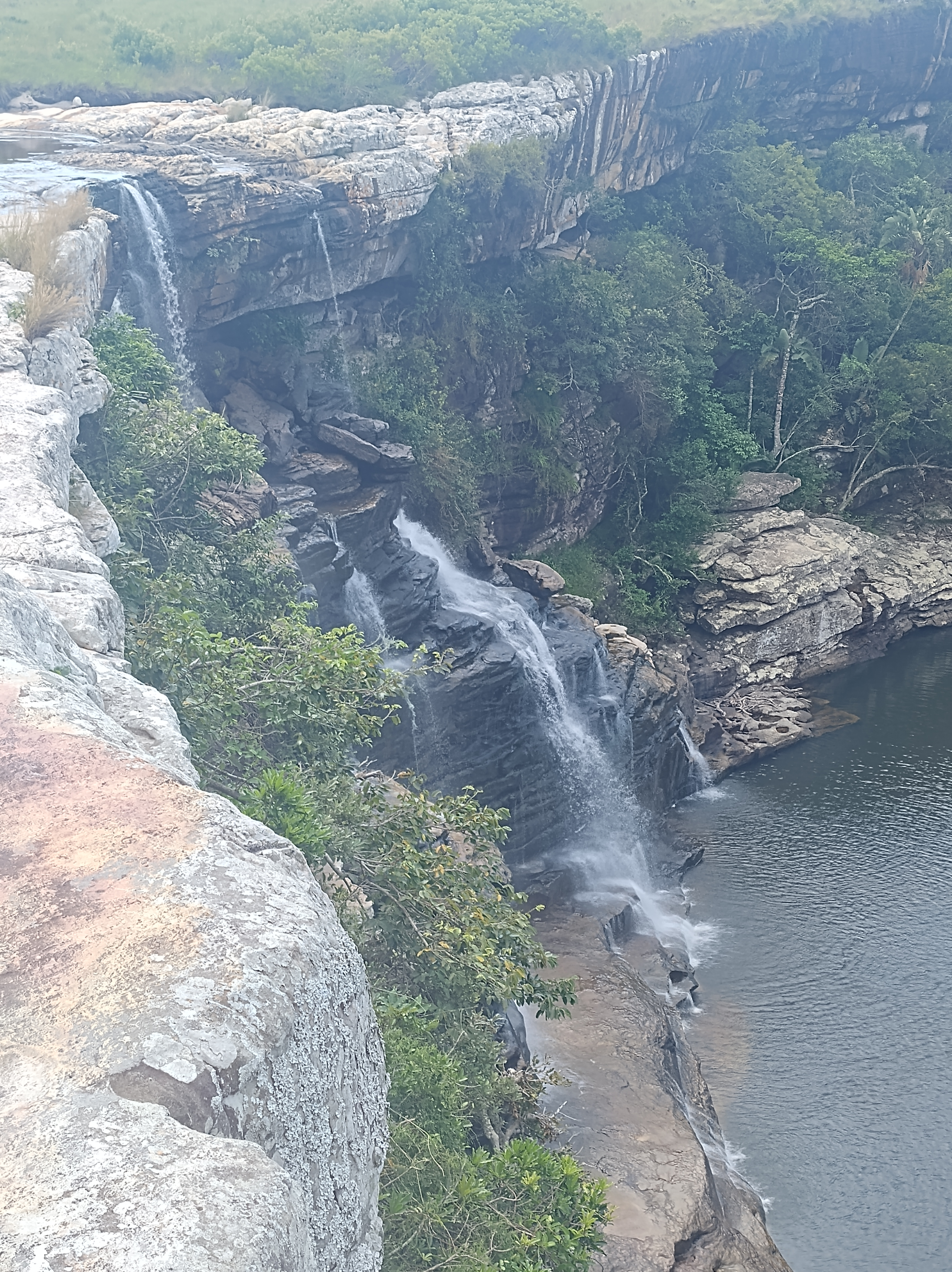
MkambatiHorseshoe Falls

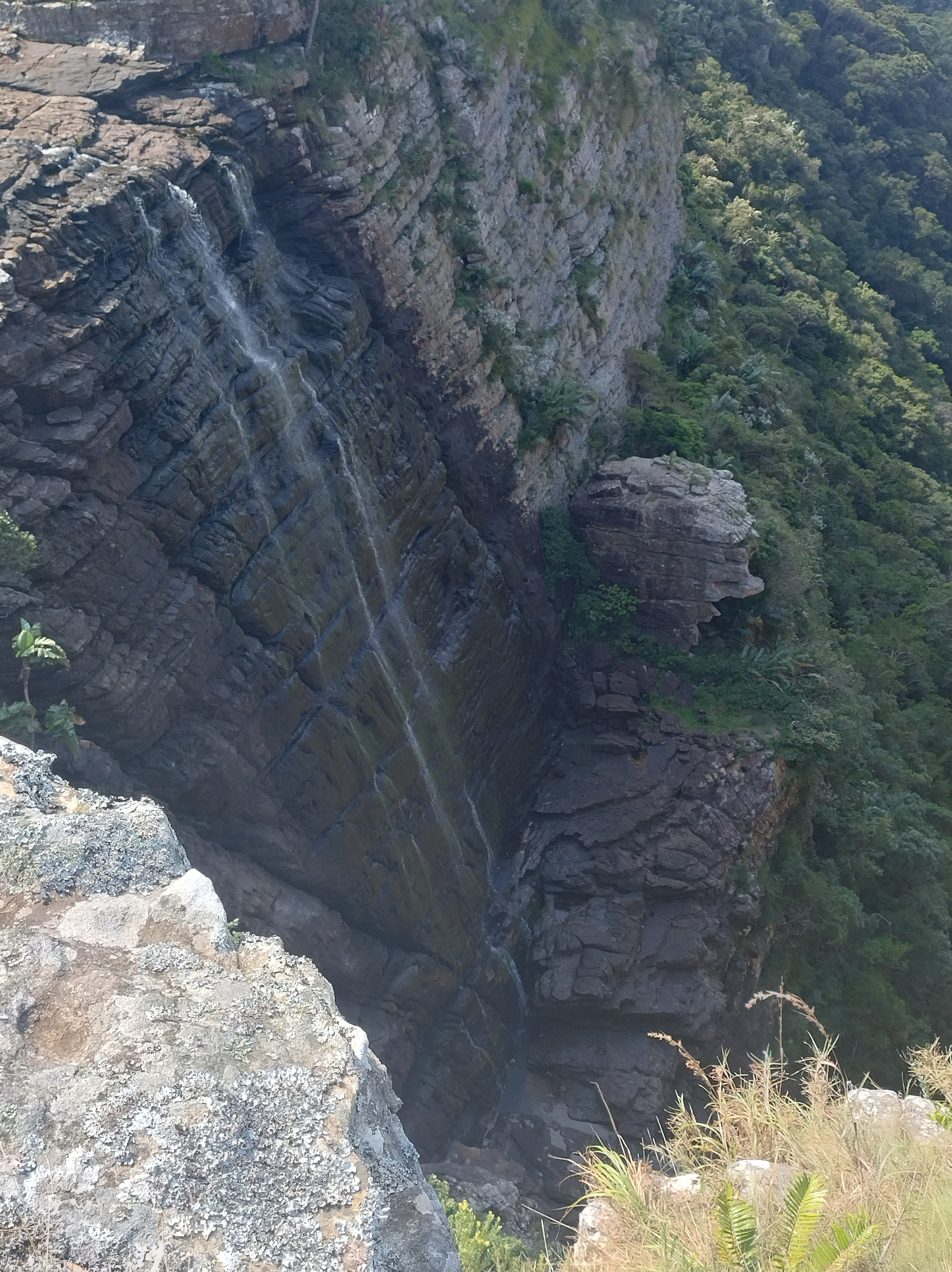
Mtentu Swallow Trail Falls
