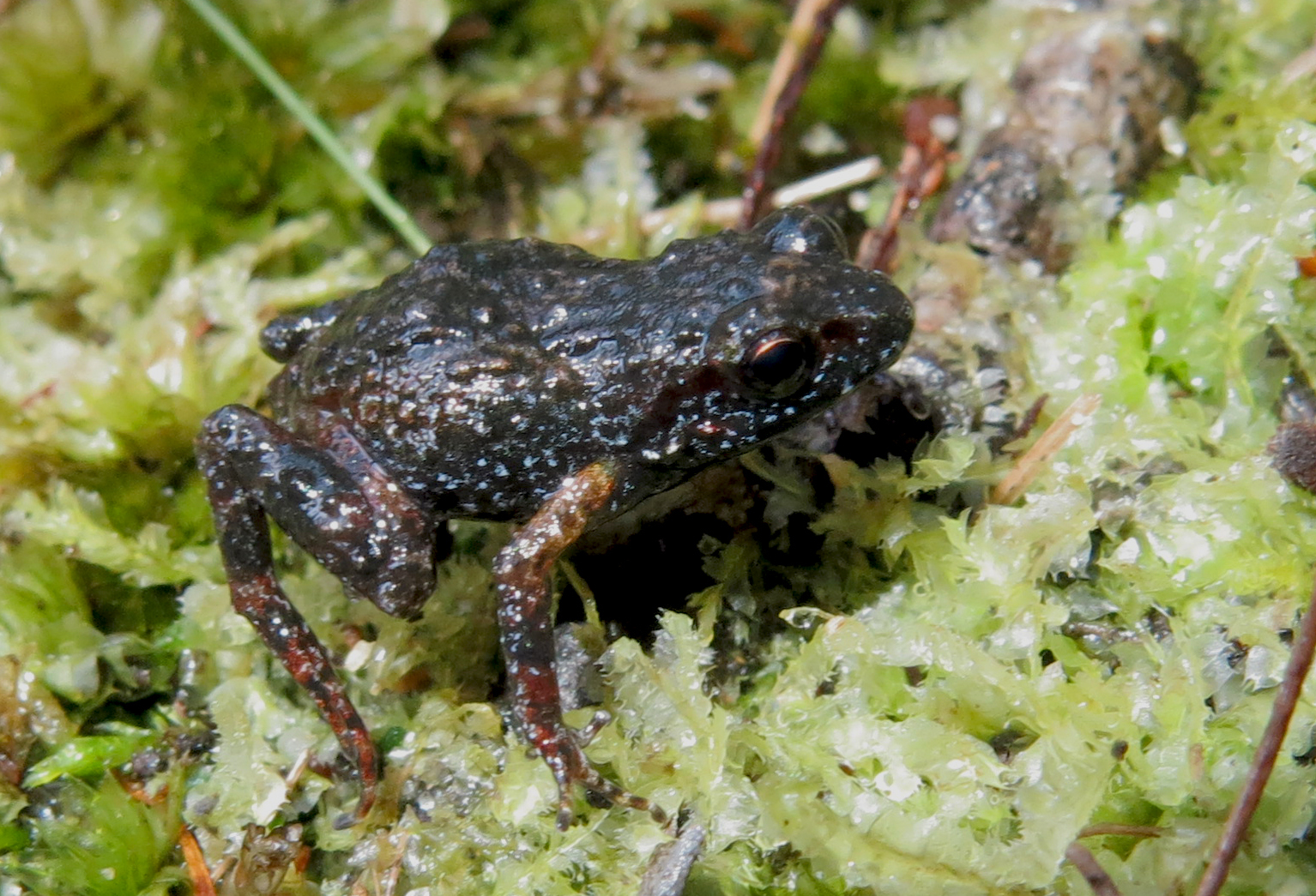

Conservation status
- Near Threatened (IUCN 3.1)

Scientific classification
- Kingdom: Animalia
- Phylum: Chordata
- Class: Amphibia
- Order: Anura
- Family: Pyxicephalidae
- Genus: Arthroleptella
- Species: A. drewesii

Binomial name
- Arthroleptella drewesii Channing, Hendricks & Dawood, 1994

= Drewes' moss frog =

Species of amphibian

The Drewes' moss frog (Arthroleptella drewesii) is a species of frog in the family Pyxicephalidae. It is endemic to Fernkloof Nature Reserve & nearby surroundings in South Africa. Its natural habitats are Mediterranean-type shrubby vegetation and rivers. It is threatened by habitat loss.
