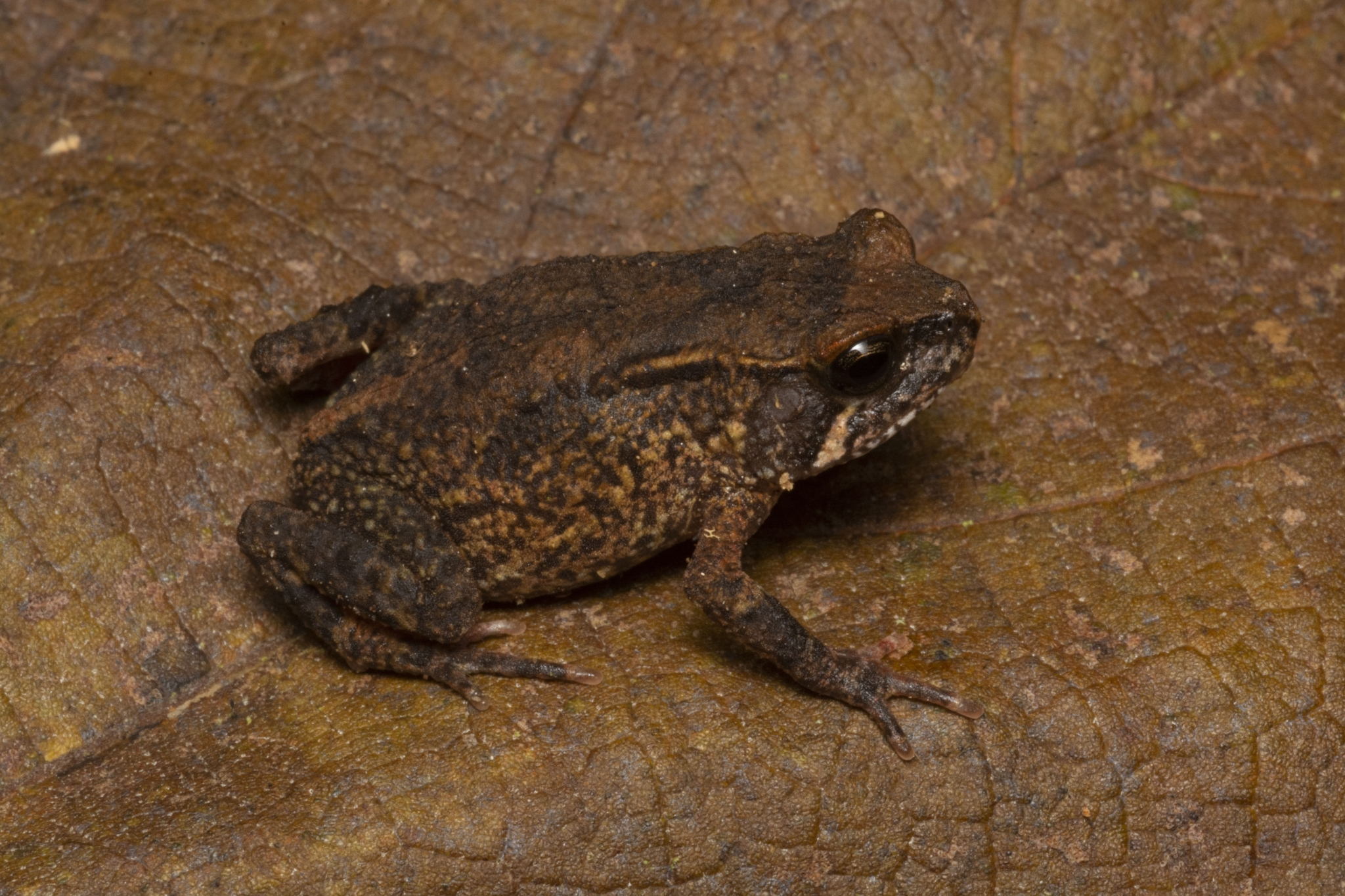

Conservation status
- Critically Endangered (IUCN 3.1)
- CITES Appendix I

Scientific classification
- Kingdom: Animalia
- Phylum: Chordata
- Class: Amphibia
- Order: Anura
- Family: Bufonidae
- Genus: Nectophrynoides
- Species: N. laticeps

Binomial name
- Nectophrynoides laticeps Channing, Menegon, Salvidio, and Akker, 2005
- Nectophrynoides laticeps is only known from the Ukaguru Mountains, Tanzania

= Nectophrynoides laticeps =

Species of amphibian

Nectophrynoides laticeps is a species of toad in the family Bufonidae. It is endemic to the Ukaguru Mountains of Tanzania. Common name wide-headed viviparous toad has been proposed for it.

== Description ==
Nectophrynoides laticeps measure 14–24 mm (0.6–0.9 in) in snout–urostyle length, the largest specimen being the female holotype. This toad can be distinguished from the other known species of the genus by a combination of morphological characters, and has an advertisement call different from all other recorded calls of Nectophrynoides. The dorsal and ventral coloration is variable with a pink tinge. It is probably ovoviviparous – the eggs remain within the mother's body until they hatch.

== Habitat and conservation ==
Nectophrynoides laticeps lives in leaf litter on the floor on montane forest at elevations of 1,800–2,200 m (5,900–7,200 ft) above sea level. It is active during the day and at night. It appears to be common within its small range. However, the forests in the Ukaguru Mountains are poorly protected, and this species is probably suffering from habitat loss. It is present in the Mamiwa-Kisara Forest Reserve.
