= Nectophrynoides =

- Nectophrynoides tornieri

Scientific classification
- Kingdom: Animalia
- Phylum: Chordata
- Class: Amphibia
- Order: Anura
- Family: Bufonidae
- Genus: Nectophrynoides; Noble, 1926

Type species
- Nectophryne tornieri Roux, 1906

Synonyms
- Tornierobates; Miranda-Ribeiro, 1926

Genus of amphibians

Nectophrynoides is a genus of true toads, family Bufonidae. They are endemic to Eastern Arc forests and wetlands in Tanzania, and all except N. tornieri are threatened. Species of the genus are ovoviviparous: fertilization is internal, and the females give birth to fully developed, small toadlets. Together with the West Africa Nimbaphrynoides (which was included in Nectophrynoides in the past) and Limnonectes larvaepartus, they are the only frogs/toads in the world that do not lay eggs. The Ethiopian Altiphrynoides (includes Spinophrynoides), which lay eggs, were also part of Nectophrynoides in the past.

== Species ==
The genus Nectophrynoides contains 16 accepted species.

Binomial name and authority	Common name
Nectophrynoides asperginis Poynton, Howell, Clarke & Lovett, 1999	Kihansi spray toad
Nectophrynoides cryptus Perret, 1971	secret tree toad
Nectophrynoides frontierei Menegon, Salvidio & Loader, 2004	frontier forest toad
Nectophrynoides laevis Menegon, Salvidio & Loader, 2004	smooth forest toad
Nectophrynoides laticeps Channing, Menegon, Salvidio & Akker, 2005	
Nectophrynoides luhomeroensis Thrane, Lyakurwa, Liedtke, Menegon, Petzold, Loader & Scherz, 2025	
Nectophrynoides minutus Perret, 1972	minute tree toad
Nectophrynoides paulae Menegon, Salvidio, Ngalason & Loader, 2007	
Nectophrynoides poyntoni Menegon, Salvidio & Loader, 2004	Poynton's forest toad
Nectophrynoides pseudotornieri Menegon, Salvidio & Loader, 2004	pseudo forest toad
Nectophrynoides saliensis Thrane, Lyakurwa, Liedtke, Menegon, Petzold, Loader & Scherz, 2025	
Nectophrynoides tornieri (Roux, 1906)	Tornier's Tree Toad
Nectophrynoides uhehe Thrane, Lyakurwa, Liedtke, Menegon, Petzold, Loader & Scherz, 2025	
Nectophrynoides vestergaardi Menegon, Salvidio & Loader, 2004	Vestergaard's forest toad
Nectophrynoides viviparus (Tornier, 1905)	Morogoro tree toad
Nectophrynoides wendyae Clarke, 1988	Uzungwe Scarp tree toad
