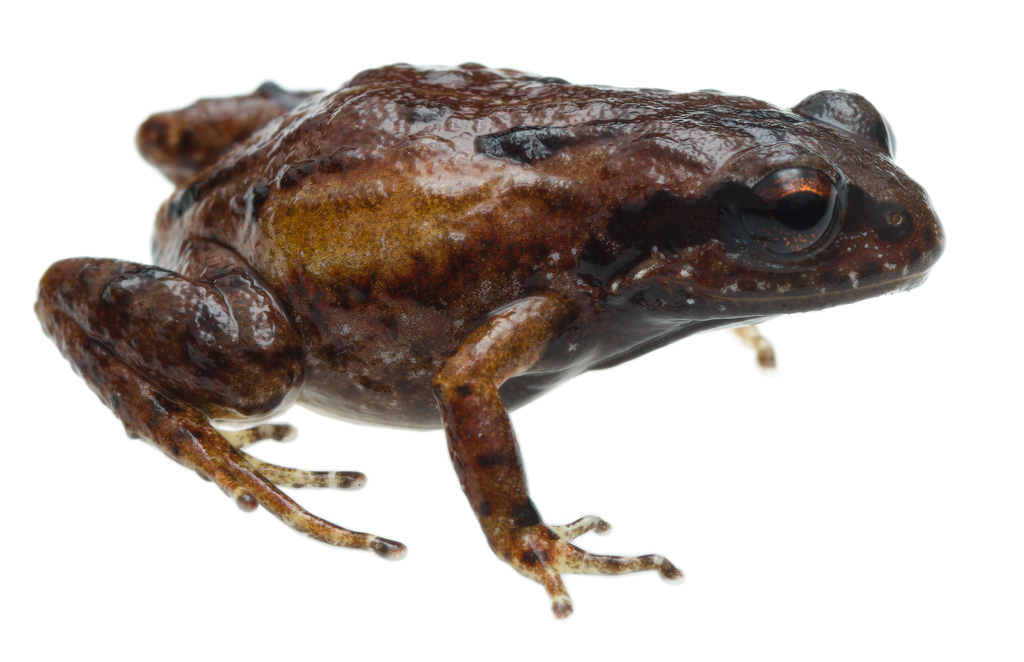

Scientific classification
- Kingdom: Animalia
- Phylum: Chordata
- Class: Amphibia
- Order: Anura
- Family: Pyxicephalidae
- Genus: Arthroleptella
- Species: A. kogelbergensis

Binomial name
- Arthroleptella kogelbergensis Turner & Channing, 2017

= Kogelsberg moss frog =

Species of frog

The Kogelsberg moss frog (Arthroleptella kogelbergensis) is a species of frog in the family Pyxicephalidae. It is endemic to Kogelberg mountain and its surroundings in South Africa.
