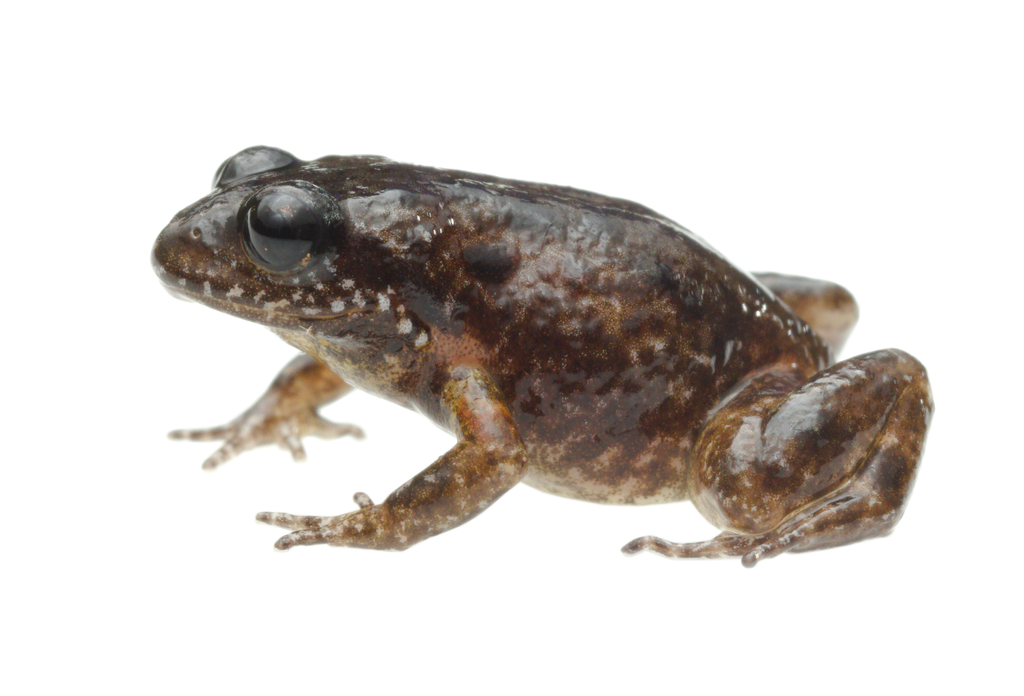

Conservation status
- Critically Endangered (IUCN 3.1)

Scientific classification
- Kingdom: Animalia
- Phylum: Chordata
- Class: Amphibia
- Order: Anura
- Family: Pyxicephalidae
- Genus: Arthroleptella
- Species: A. subvoce

Binomial name
- Arthroleptella subvoce Turner, de Villiers, Dawood, and Channing, 2004

= Arthroleptella subvoce =

Species of amphibian

Arthroleptella subvoce is a species of frogs in the family Pyxicephalidae. It is endemic to South Africa and only known from the Groot Winterhoek Wilderness Area, Western Cape. Common name northern moss frog has been coined for it. The specific name subvoce is Latin for "under voice" and refers to the very subdued male advertisement call of this frog.

== Description ==
Adult males measure 12–13 mm (0.5–0.5 in) and adult females, based on the only female in the type series, 14 mm (0.6 in) in snout–vent length. The snout is bluntly rounded. The pupil is horizontal. The limbs are short and the fingers and toes lack webbing; the toe tips are very slightly expanded. Skin is smooth but there is a pair of slightly elevated, elongated dorsolateral glandular patches. The dorsum has brown ground colour. There is a pair of para-vertebral and a pair of dorso-lateral series of dark brown blotches or bands, the latter sometimes indistinct. The upper lip has a few white flecks. There is dark band running from behind the eye to the insertion of the forelimb. The upper surface of the upper forelimb is orange-brown. The ventrum is pale with some speckling.

The call comprises a pulsed chirp of 4–6 pulses and is followed by 2–6 evenly spaced double clicks, often ending with one or two single pulse clicks.

== Habitat and conservation ==
Arthroleptella subvoce occurs in thickly vegetated seeps dominated by restios within montane fynbos at elevations of 900–1,100 m (3,000–3,600 ft) above sea level. Males call from the bases of dense restio clumps.

The species is known from three localities within the Groot Winterhoek Wilderness Area. While its range falls almost entirely in this protected area, it is threatened by habitat loss and deterioration caused by fires and alien plants. One of the localities is close to human residences, making contamination of water a potential threat.
