= Nectophrynoides pseudotornieri =

Conservation status
- Critically Endangered (IUCN 3.1)
- CITES Appendix I

Scientific classification
- Kingdom: Animalia
- Phylum: Chordata
- Class: Amphibia
- Order: Anura
- Family: Bufonidae
- Genus: Nectophrynoides
- Species: N. pseudotornieri

Binomial name
- Nectophrynoides pseudotornieri Menegon, Salvidio, and Loader, 2004

Species of amphibian

Nectophrynoides pseudotornieri is a species of toad in the family Bufonidae. It is endemic to the Uluguru Mountains in eastern Tanzania. Common names pseudo forest toad and false Tornier's viviparous toad have been proposed for it. Its specific name refers to its similarity to Nectophrynoides tornieri.

== Description ==
Males grow to 25 mm (1.0 in) and females to 29 mm (1.1 in) in snout–urostyle length, corresponding to the holotype and the paratype, respectively. The parotoid glands are present but indistinct. The tympanum is absent. The fingers and the toes are partially webbed and have truncated discs on their tips. The dorsum is rough with small tubercles and is tan to golden in colour, with darker markings. Sometimes there are golden flecks on the sides. The lower surfaces are cream, with some dots under the throat. The eyes are golden.

== Habitat and conservation ==
Nectophrynoides pseudotornieri occurs in montane rainforest (considered submontane by Menegon and colleagues) of the eastern slopes of the northern part of the Uluguru Mountains at elevations of 1,080–1,345 m (3,543–4,413 ft) above sea level. It probably is ovoviviparous as other Nectophrynoides, giving birth to tiny toadlets.

This species is restricted to a single location within the Uluguru North Forest Reserve. Though this gives it some level of protection, habitat loss occurs inside the reserve and is threatening this species.
