= Nectophrynoides laevis =

Conservation status
- Data Deficient (IUCN 3.1)
- CITES Appendix I

Scientific classification
- Kingdom: Animalia
- Phylum: Chordata
- Class: Amphibia
- Order: Anura
- Family: Bufonidae
- Genus: Nectophrynoides
- Species: N. laevis

Binomial name
- Nectophrynoides laevis Menegon, Salvidio & Loader, 2004

Species of amphibian

Nectophrynoides laevis, the smooth forest toad, is a species of toad in the family Bufonidae.

It is endemic to Tanzania. Its natural habitats are subtropical or tropical moist montane forests, subtropical or tropical low-altitude grassland and swamps. A single specimen was collected in 2002 and it was first described in 2004.

== Description ==
This toad is known only from a single specimen which was 24.8 millimetres (0.98 in) in snout to vent length. It is a robust toad with paratoid glands twice as long as they are wide and no tympani, a fact which distinguishes it from the otherwise similar Nectophrynoides viviparus. The back is a dappled grey colour, smooth and covered with small warts. A dark line runs along the spine. The belly is whitish with a central dark line which continues along the inside of the limbs. There are large glands on the limbs and there is some webbing on the hind feet but none on the fore feet. The tips of the digits are noticeably enlarged.

== Distribution ==
The single specimen of Nectophrynoides laevis was found in the Uluguru Mountains in eastern Tanzania. This area is tropical, forest-clad and mountainous but the exact habitat in which it was found is unknown but is likely to be at an altitude of at least 2,000 metres (6,600 ft) above sea level.

== Life cycle ==
As this species is known from a single male specimen, its life cycle is unknown. However, other members of its genus are ovoviviparous, with small toads developing from eggs retained inside the female's body, and it is probable that it also produces live young in this way.

== Status ==
As this species has only recently been described, its conservation status is unclear and it is listed as "Data Deficient" by the IUCN Red List of Threatened Species. The Uluguru South Forest Reserve where it is found is a remote area in the Uluguru Mountains where it would appear to face few threats.
