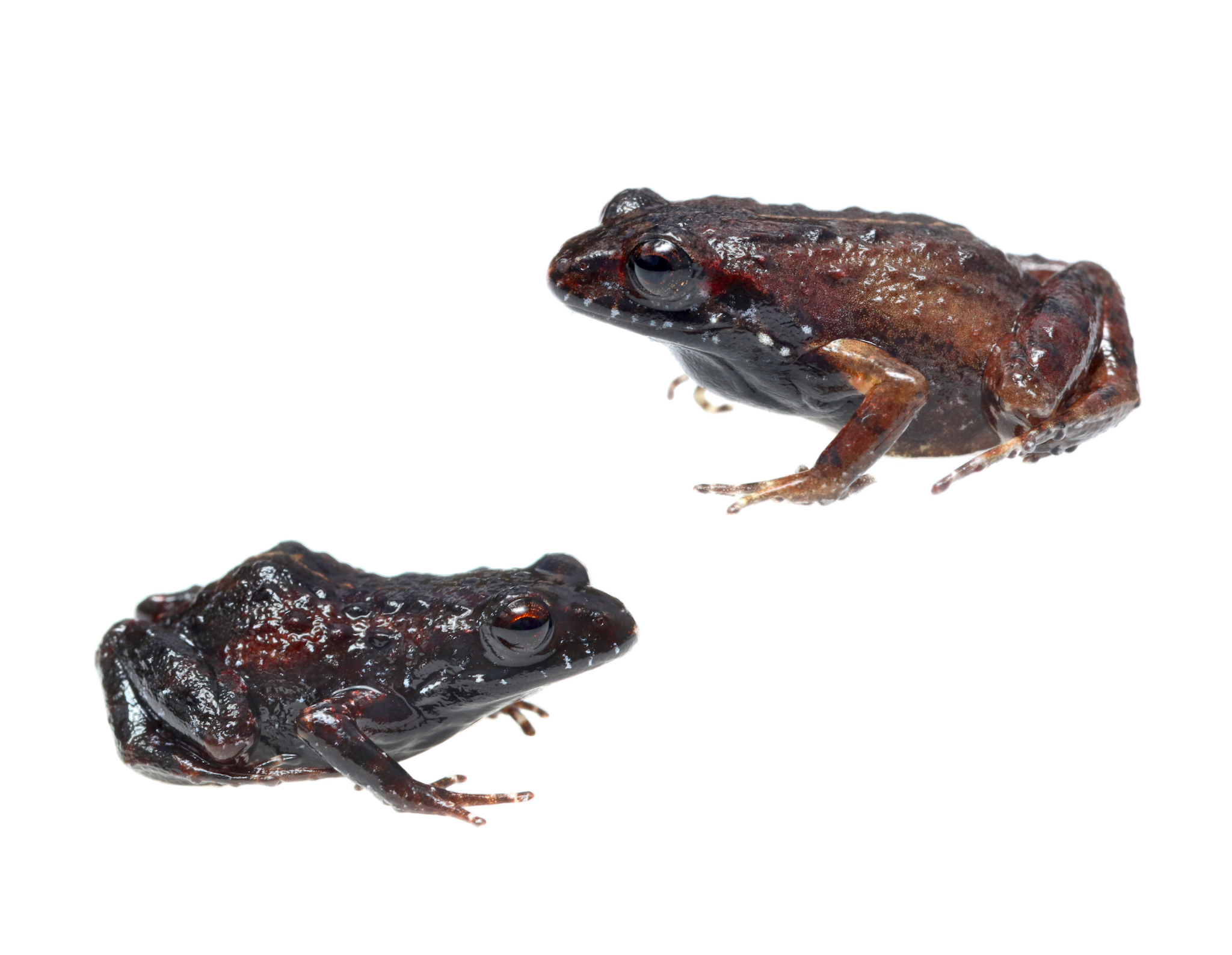

Scientific classification
- Kingdom: Animalia
- Phylum: Chordata
- Class: Amphibia
- Order: Anura
- Family: Pyxicephalidae
- Genus: Arthroleptella
- Species: A. atermina

Binomial name
- Arthroleptella atermina Turner & Channing, 2017

= Riviersonderent moss frog =

Species of amphibian

The Riviersonderent moss frog (Arthroleptella atermina) is a species of frog in the family Pyxicephalidae. It is endemic to Riviersonderend Mountains and nearby areas in South Africa.
