= Ngoni =

Ngoni may refer to:

== People ==
- Ngonidzashe Makusha (born 1987), Zimbabwean sprinter and long jumper
- Ngoni Makusha (born 1994), Zimbabwean sprinter

== Other uses ==
- Ngoni (instrument), string instrument
- Ngoni language, a Bantu language of Zambia, Tanzania, Mozambique, and Malawi
- Ngoni people, ethnic group in east southern Africa
- Ngoni Moss Frog
