= N. minutus =

N. minutus may refer to:

- Nectophrynoides minutus, a toad species endemic to Tanzania
- Numenius minutus, the little curlew, a wader species which breeds in the far north of Siberia

== See also ==
- List of Latin and Greek words commonly used in systematic names#M
