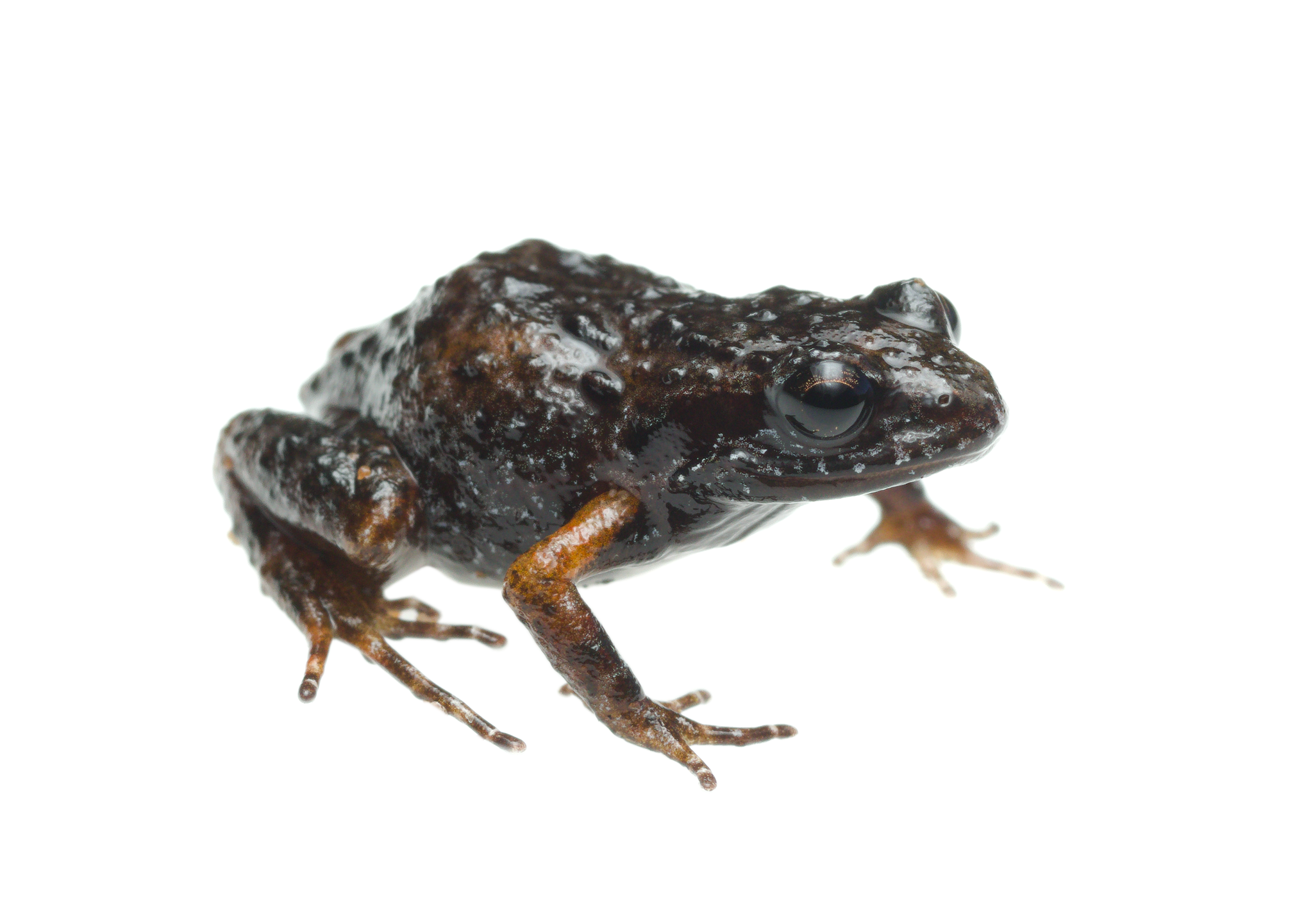

Conservation status
- Near Threatened (IUCN 3.1)

Scientific classification
- Kingdom: Animalia
- Phylum: Chordata
- Class: Amphibia
- Order: Anura
- Family: Pyxicephalidae
- Genus: Arthroleptella
- Species: A. landdrosia

Binomial name
- Arthroleptella landdrosia Dawood & Channing, 2000

= Landdros moss frog =

Species of amphibian

The Landdros moss frog (Arthroleptella landdrosia) is a species of frog in the family Pyxicephalidae.

It is endemic to South Africa. Its natural habitats are Mediterranean-type shrubby vegetation and rivers. It is threatened by habitat loss.
