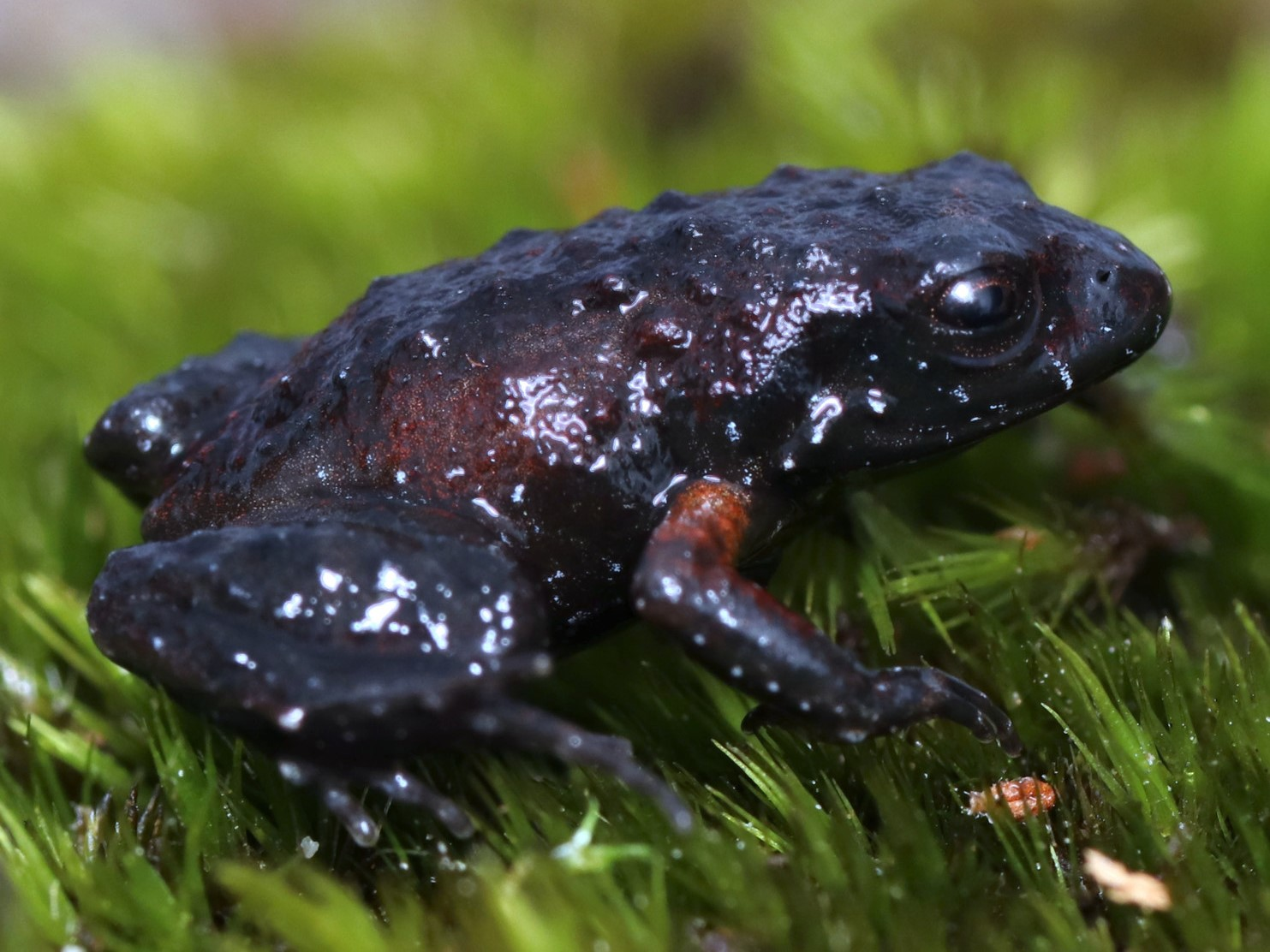

Conservation status
- Critically Endangered (IUCN 3.1)

Scientific classification
- Kingdom: Animalia
- Phylum: Chordata
- Class: Amphibia
- Order: Anura
- Family: Pyxicephalidae
- Genus: Arthroleptella
- Species: A. rugosa

Binomial name
- Arthroleptella rugosa Turner and Channing, 2008

= Arthroleptella rugosa =

Species of amphibian

Arthroleptella rugosa is a species of frog in the family Pyxicephalidae. It is endemic to South Africa and only known from the Klein Swartberg Mountain, an inselberg near Caledon, Western Cape. The specific name rugosa is Latin for wrinkled or rough and refers to the rough appearance of this species (caused by distinct glandular tubercles ) as well as its rough sounding advertisement call. Accordingly, the common name rough moss frog has been suggested for it.

== Description ==
Arthroleptella rugosa are small frogs. Males in the type series measured 11.9–14.1 mm (0.47–0.56 in) and the single female 15.5 mm (0.61 in) in snout–vent length. There are a large number of very distinct glandular protuberances on the dorsal surfaces, distinct from all other Arthroleptella species. The limbs are relatively short. Adults are uniform dark chocolate brown in colour, with slightly paler, irregular dorsolateral bands that may become visible under bright lighting conditions. The sole female was densely speckled dark and light grey.

The typical male advertisement call is a "chirp", a short pulsed call of two to four pulses. The second type is a "chuckle" composed of 6–10 pulsed notes, making rough, squeaky sounding chirp that is quite different from the calls in other Arthroleptella species. The chuckle may precede the typical chirp call or an aggression call.

A single clutch of seven eggs has been observed. The tadpoles do not swim; instead they remain almost sedentary on a moist substrate until metamorphosing approximately 3 weeks after hatching. The tadpoles do not have a functional mouth.

== Habitat and conservation ==
Arthroleptella rugosa inhabit fynbos heathland vegetation and can be found in dense Restionaceae stands very near seepages at elevations of 500–800 m (1,600–2,600 ft) above sea level.

The habitat is under severe threat from fire and invasive plant species. In addition, the species has very small extent of occurrence (searches on neighbouring mountains have not revealed any specimens), and has therefore been assessed as "Critically Endangered".

Location of the Klein Swartberg near Caledon, South Africa. This mountain is not to be confused with a mountain of the same name in the Swartberg mountains.
