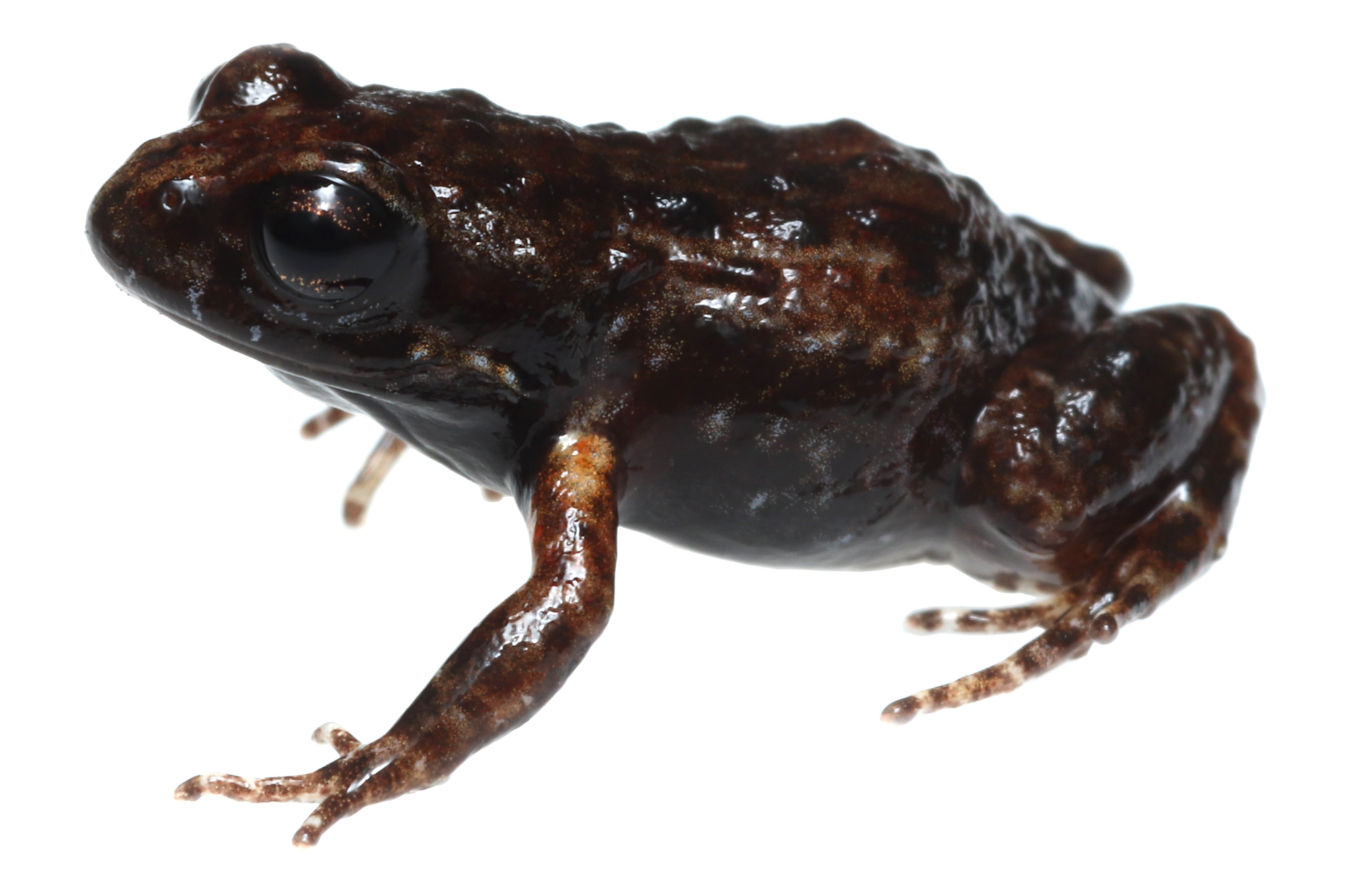

Scientific classification
- Kingdom: Animalia
- Phylum: Chordata
- Class: Amphibia
- Order: Anura
- Family: Pyxicephalidae
- Genus: Arthroleptella
- Species: A. draconella

Binomial name
- Arthroleptella draconella Turner & Channing, 2017

= Drakenstein moss frog =

Species of frog

The Drakenstein moss frog (Arthroleptella draconella) is a species of frog in the family Pyxicephalidae. It is endemic to Drakenstein mountain and nearby in South Africa.
