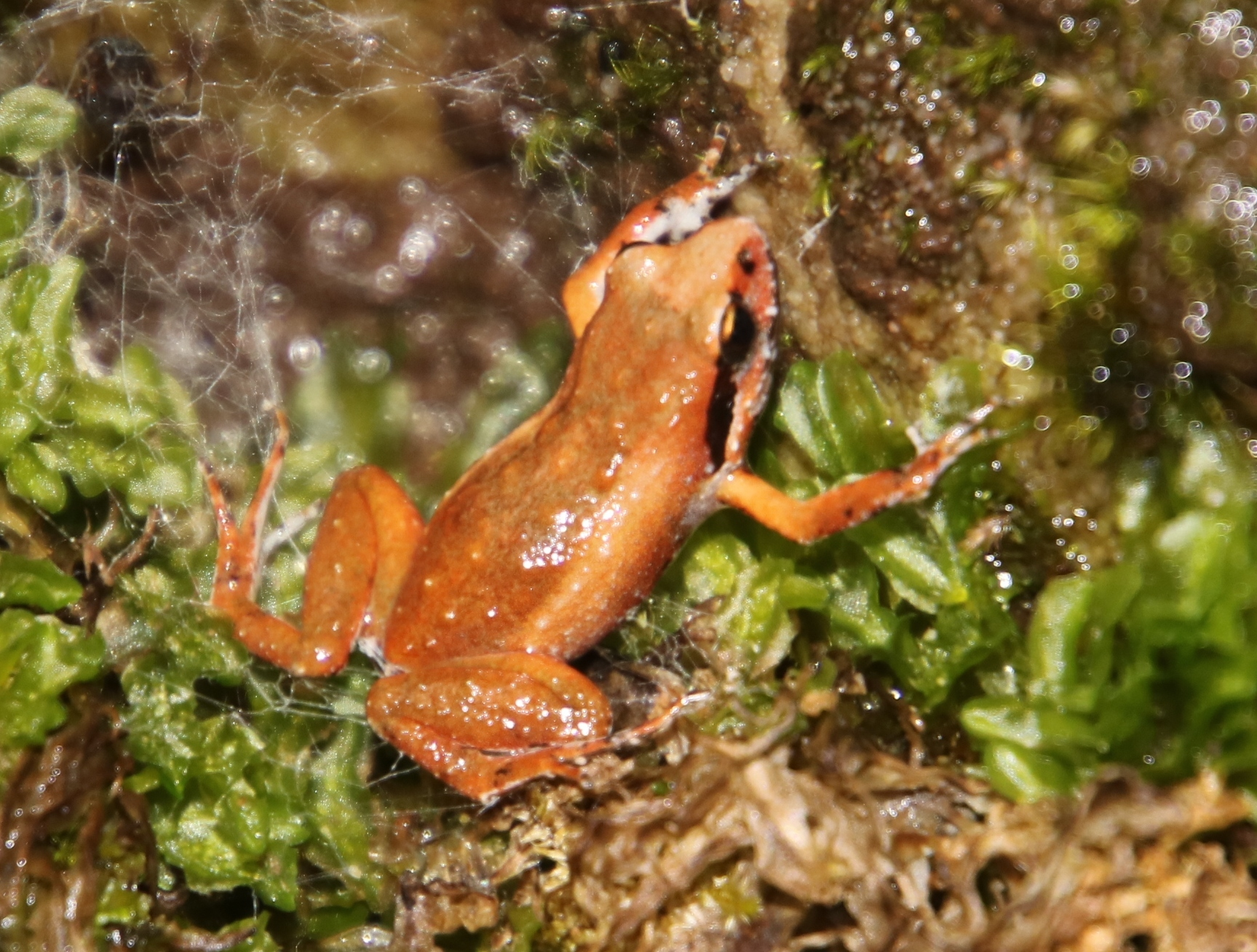
- Arthroleptella lightfooti

Scientific classification
- Kingdom: Animalia
- Phylum: Chordata
- Class: Amphibia
- Order: Anura
- Family: Pyxicephalidae
- Subfamily: Cacosterninae
- Genus: Arthroleptella; Hewitt, 1926

Species
- See text

= Arthroleptella =

Genus of amphibians

Arthroleptella is a genus of frogs known as moss frogs in the family Pyxicephalidae. The ten species of this genus are endemic to South Africa.

It contains the following species:

- Arthroleptella atermina Turner and Channing, 2017 - Riviersonderent moss frog
- Arthroleptella bicolor Hewitt, 1926 – Bainskloof moss frog
- Arthroleptella draconella Turner and Channing, 2017 – Drakenstein moss frog
- Arthroleptella drewesii Channing, Hendricks and Dawood, 1994 – Drewes' moss frog
- Arthroleptella kogelbergensis Turner and Channing, 2017 – Kogelsberg moss frog
- Arthroleptella landdrosia Dawood and Channing, 2000 – Landdros moss frog
- Arthroleptella lightfooti (Boulenger, 1910) – Lightfoot's moss frog
- Arthroleptella rugosa Turner and Channing, 2008 – Rough moss frog
- Arthroleptella subvoce Turner, de Villiers, Dawood and Channing, 2004 – Northern moss frog
- Arthroleptella villiersi Hewitt, 1935 – De Villiers' moss frog

Two other species were formerly classified as Arthroleptella before recently found to belong to the formerly monotypic genus Anhydrophryne (Dawood and Stam 2006):

- Arthroleptella hewitti → Anhydrophryne hewitti (FitzSimons, 1947) – Hewitt's moss frog
- Arthroleptella ngongoniensis → Anhydrophryne ngongoniensis (Bishop and Passmore, 1993) – Ngoni moss frog
