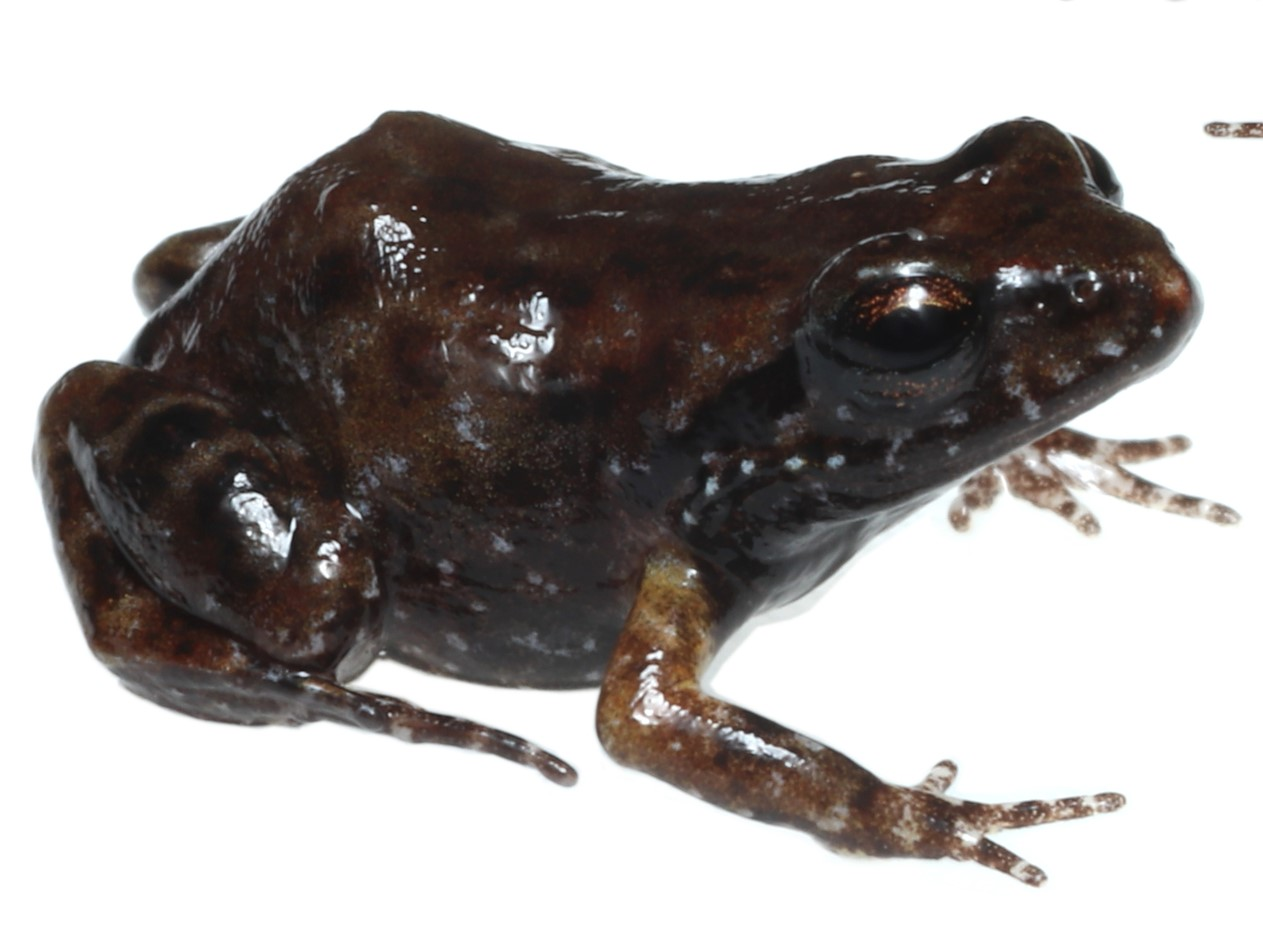

Conservation status
- Least Concern (IUCN 3.1)

Scientific classification
- Kingdom: Animalia
- Phylum: Chordata
- Class: Amphibia
- Order: Anura
- Family: Pyxicephalidae
- Genus: Arthroleptella
- Species: A. bicolor

Binomial name
- Arthroleptella bicolor Hewitt, 1926

Synonyms
- Phrynobatrachus bicolor (Hewitt, 1926)

= Bainskloof moss frog =

Species of frog

The Bainskloof moss frog (Arthroleptella bicolor), also known as Bainskloof chirping frog, is a species of frog in the family Pyxicephalidae. It is endemic to South Africa.

== Taxonomy ==
The Bainskloof moss frog was formerly considered conspecific with Arthroleptella lightfooti.

== Description ==
The Bainskloof moss frog is a small frog which reaches a maximum length of 22 mm. The body is rather squat with short limbs and a rounded head. The background colour of its skin varies from orangey brown to black with darker patches and paler spots on the back and legs.

== Distribution and habitat ==
The Bainskloof moss frog is endemic to Riviersonderend Mountains, Dutoitsberg, Elandskloof and Limietberg Mountains in Western Cape Province, South Africa. This species can be found between 300-2,000 m above sea level. The extent of this species total distribution is probably less than 20,000 km^{2}.

The Bainskloof moss frog favours wet mossy areas near watercourses, hillside or roadside seepages, and heavily vegetated streams, within montane fynbos and frequently on steep hillsides. Its known range is situated outside the 750mm isohyet.

== Biology ==
The Bainskloof moss frog begins breeding at the onset of the winter rains and the females lay small clutches of 8–10 eggs among moss or similar vegetation in seepages. The male frogs apparently guard the eggs as they call from the laying sites. The eggs hatch into fully formed tiny, 4mm, long froglets rather than tadpoles. It mainly feeds on small invertebrates.

== Conservation status ==
This species is patchily distributed but widespread, in small discrete populations within the montane fynbos which is not a significantly fragmented habitat. The habitat of the Bainskloof Moss Frog lies mainly within protected areas, although even here it is threatened by the spread of pines and other alien species and too frequent bush fires.
