= Nectophrynoides frontierei =

Conservation status
- Data Deficient (IUCN 3.1)
- CITES Appendix I

Scientific classification
- Kingdom: Animalia
- Phylum: Chordata
- Class: Amphibia
- Order: Anura
- Family: Bufonidae
- Genus: Nectophrynoides
- Species: N. frontierei

Binomial name
- Nectophrynoides frontierei Menegon, Salvidio & Loader, 2004

Species of amphibian

Nectophrynoides frontierei is a species of toad in the family Bufonidae.

It is endemic to the Eastern Arc Mountains of Tanzania and was discovered in Amani Nature Reserve within the East Usambara Mountains. It is named after Frontier, an organisation carrying out scientific research in the area. Its natural habitats are subtropical or tropical moist lowland forests and subtropical or tropical moist montane forests. It is threatened by habitat loss.
