= Nectophrynoides poyntoni =

Conservation status
- Critically Endangered (IUCN 3.1)
- CITES Appendix I

Scientific classification
- Kingdom: Animalia
- Phylum: Chordata
- Class: Amphibia
- Order: Anura
- Family: Bufonidae
- Genus: Nectophrynoides
- Species: N. poyntoni

Binomial name
- Nectophrynoides poyntoni Menegon, Salvidio, and Loader, 2004
- Nectophrynoides poyntoni is only known from the Udzungwa Mountains in Tanzania

Species of toad

Nectophrynoides poyntoni, also known as Poynton's forest toad, is a species of toad in the family Bufonidae. It is endemic to the Udzungwa Mountains in Tanzania and is only known from its type locality in the Mkalazi Valley. This species is only known from a single collection in 2003 and has not been seen ever since, despite targeted searches. Therefore, it is feared that it has strongly declined and might already be extinct.

== Etymology ==
The specific name poyntoni honours John Charles Poynton, a South African herpetologist whose work has "greatly improved the understanding of the amphibians of Tanzania".

== Description ==
Adult males measure 19–24 mm (0.7–0.9 in) and adult females, based on two specimens only, 20–24 mm (0.8–0.9 in) in snout–urostyle length. The snout is short. The eyes are prominent. The tympanum and tympanic annulus are present. The parotoid gland consists of two parts, the anterior and posterior part; the anterior part is formed by a row of small glands, while the posterior half is large and bean-shaped. The finger and toe tips are rounded. The fingers have no webbing while some webbing is present between the toes IV and V. Dorsal ground colour varies from brown to light brown. There are two black stripes running from the tips of the snout to the scapular region. The dorsum may have scattered and variable dark blotches. The lower surfaces are grey.

The male advertisement call consists of pulse trains about one second long, with an interval of about 2.5–3.5 seconds. The dominant frequency is about 2.9 kHz.

== Habitat and conservation ==
The type locality is moist submontane rainforest, close to a stream, at elevations of 1,200 m (3,900 ft) above sea level. The specimens could be found specimens at night on leaves 0.6–1.6 m (2.0–5.2 ft) above the ground, while during the day they hid on the ground, under fallen trees and coarse wood debris. Males call near streams mainly after sunset, but may start already late afternoon. Breeding strategy of this species is unknown, but like other members of its genus, it is probably a live-bearer giving birth to tiny toadlets.

In 2003 Nectophrynoides poyntoni was reasonably common within its tiny range. However, later targeted searches have failed to see or hear any individuals, suggesting a population decline, or perhaps even that it is already extinct. The forest habitat of this species is declining due to wood extraction. The type locality is within the Udzungwa Mountains National Park.
