= Nectophrynoides wendyae =

Conservation status
- Critically Endangered (IUCN 3.1)
- CITES Appendix I

Scientific classification
- Kingdom: Animalia
- Phylum: Chordata
- Class: Amphibia
- Order: Anura
- Family: Bufonidae
- Genus: Nectophrynoides
- Species: N. wendyae

Binomial name
- Nectophrynoides wendyae Clarke, 1988

Synonyms
- Nectophrynoides wendyi — incorrect subsequent spelling

Species of amphibian

Nectophrynoides wendyae, also known as the Uzungwe Scarp tree toad or Wendy's forest toad, is a terrestrial toad in the family Bufonidae. It is endemic to Tanzania and is only known from a single valley in the Udzungwa Mountains. The specific name wendyae honours Wendy Clarke, the describer's wife.

== Description ==
Nectophrynoides wendyae is a robust-bodied dwarf frog. Adult males can grow to about 18 mm (0.7 in) and adult females to 22 mm (0.9 in) in snout–vent length. The head is longer than it is wide, and the snout is long and pointed. No tympanum is present. The parotoid gland are distinct but low and ridge-like. The finger and the toe tips are pointed. The toes have very reduced webbing. Skin is generally smooth but there are some scattered spines/tubercles. Alcohol-preserved specimens are dorsally tan brown with scattered darker brown specks. The ventral surfaces are mostly light with scattered minute black specks, but the interfemoral region has a large chocolate-brown mark beset with white tubercles.

== Habitat and conservation ==
Nectophrynoides wendyae occurs in montane rainforest at elevations of 1,500–1,650 m (4,920–5,410 ft) above sea level. It is a leaf-litter dweller; the type series was caught with pitfall traps.

While quite abundant in one tiny part of its range, Nectophrynoides wendyae is listed as critically endangered due to its very restricted distribution (estimated extent of occurrence no more than 15 km^{2}) and ongoing habitat deterioration and loss. It occurs in the Udzungwa Scarp Forest Reserve, but the area is not well protected.
