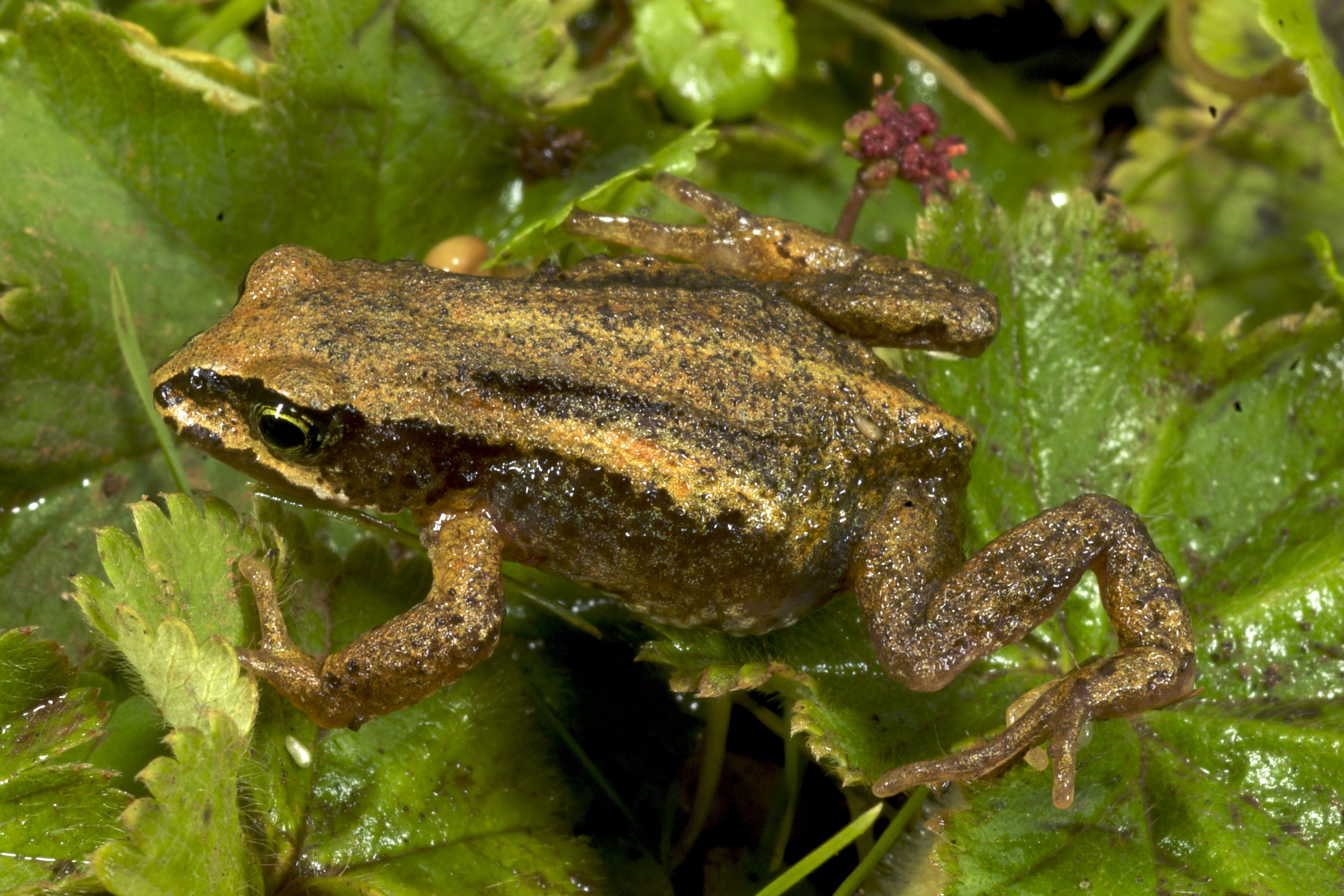
- Member species Altiphrynoides malcolmi

Scientific classification
- Kingdom: Animalia
- Phylum: Chordata
- Class: Amphibia
- Order: Anura
- Family: Bufonidae
- Genus: Altiphrynoides; Dubois, 1987

Diversity
- 2 species (see text)

Synonyms
- Spinophrynoides Dubois, 1987

= Altiphrynoides =

Genus of Altiphrynoides

Altiphrynoides is a genus of toads, commonly referred to as Ethiopian toads. They are restricted to highlands of south-central Ethiopia in the Arussi, Bale and Sidamo Provinces. Both species are threatened by habitat loss. They were formerly included in Nectophrynoides, but lack the unusual reproductive mode of those species (they lay eggs, while Nectophrynoides give birth to fully developed young). Conversely, some authorities treat Altiphrynoides as a monotypic genus for A. malcolmi, placing A. osgoodi in another monotypic genus, Spinophrynoides.

== Species ==
There are two species:

Binomial name and author	Common name
Altiphrynoides malcolmi (Grandison, 1978)	Malcolm's Ethiopian toad
Altiphrynoides osgoodi (Loveridge, 1932)	Osgood's Ethiopian toad
