= Nectophrynoides vestergaardi =

Conservation status
- Endangered (IUCN 3.1)
- CITES Appendix I

Scientific classification
- Kingdom: Animalia
- Phylum: Chordata
- Class: Amphibia
- Order: Anura
- Family: Bufonidae
- Genus: Nectophrynoides
- Species: N. vestergaardi

Binomial name
- Nectophrynoides vestergaardi Menegon, Salvidio, and Loader, 2004

Species of amphibian

Nectophrynoides vestergaardi, also known as the Vestergaard's forest toad, is a species of toad in the family Bufonidae. It is endemic to the West Usambara Mountains, Tanzania. It is named in honour of Martin Vestergaard, the Danish biologist who was the first to recognize that the population now described as Nectophrynoides vestergaardi was a new species.

== Description ==
Adult males measure 19–22 mm (0.7–0.9 in) and adult females 21–26 mm (0.8–1.0 in) in snout–urostyle length. The snout is short. The tympanum is distinct. The limbs are slender. The parotoid glands are present as a discrete raised elongated ridge. The fingers and toe tips are rounded. The fingers have traces of webbing while the toes have some basal webbing. Preserved specimens have light brown dorsal ground colour and are conspicuously darker laterally. Most individuals have a fine dark mid-dorsal vertebral line from snout to urostyle. The underside has a slightly translucent pale cream colour.

The presence of a small number (18) of large, developed embryos in females suggests that this species is ovoviviparous.

== Habitat and conservation ==
Nectophrynoides vestergaardi occurs in montane forests and their ecotone toward ericaceous vegetation. It is a terrestrial species. It is locally relatively common but threatened by habitat loss caused by agricultural activities, wood extraction, and expanding human settlements. It occurs in a number of forest reserves, but these reserves require further protection.
