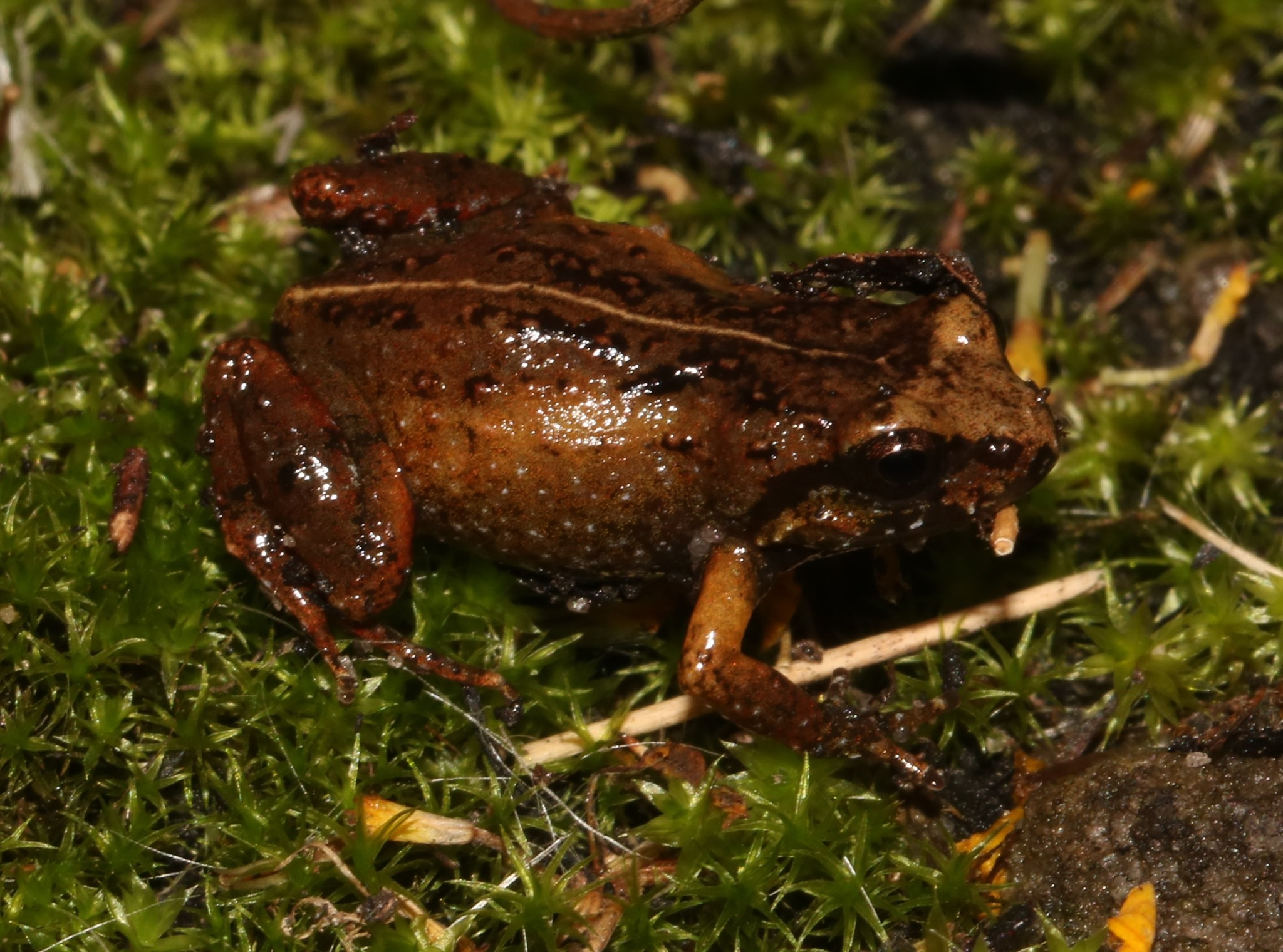

Conservation status
- Least Concern (IUCN 3.1)

Scientific classification
- Kingdom: Animalia
- Phylum: Chordata
- Class: Amphibia
- Order: Anura
- Family: Pyxicephalidae
- Genus: Arthroleptella
- Species: A. villiersi

Binomial name
- Arthroleptella villiersi Hewitt, 1935

= De Villiers' moss frog =

Species of amphibian

The De Villiers' moss frog (Arthroleptella villiersi) is a minute species of frog in the family Pyxicephalidae, which is endemic to the Western Cape, South Africa. At around 22 mm (0.87 in) length, it is one of the smallest regional species, though larger than the micro frog.

As with other moss frogs, they do not enter water, but females lay their eggs in damp vegetation, and the frogs hatch directly from the egg capsules. Its natural habitats are Mediterranean-type shrubby vegetation, rivers, and plantations. It is threatened by habitat loss.
