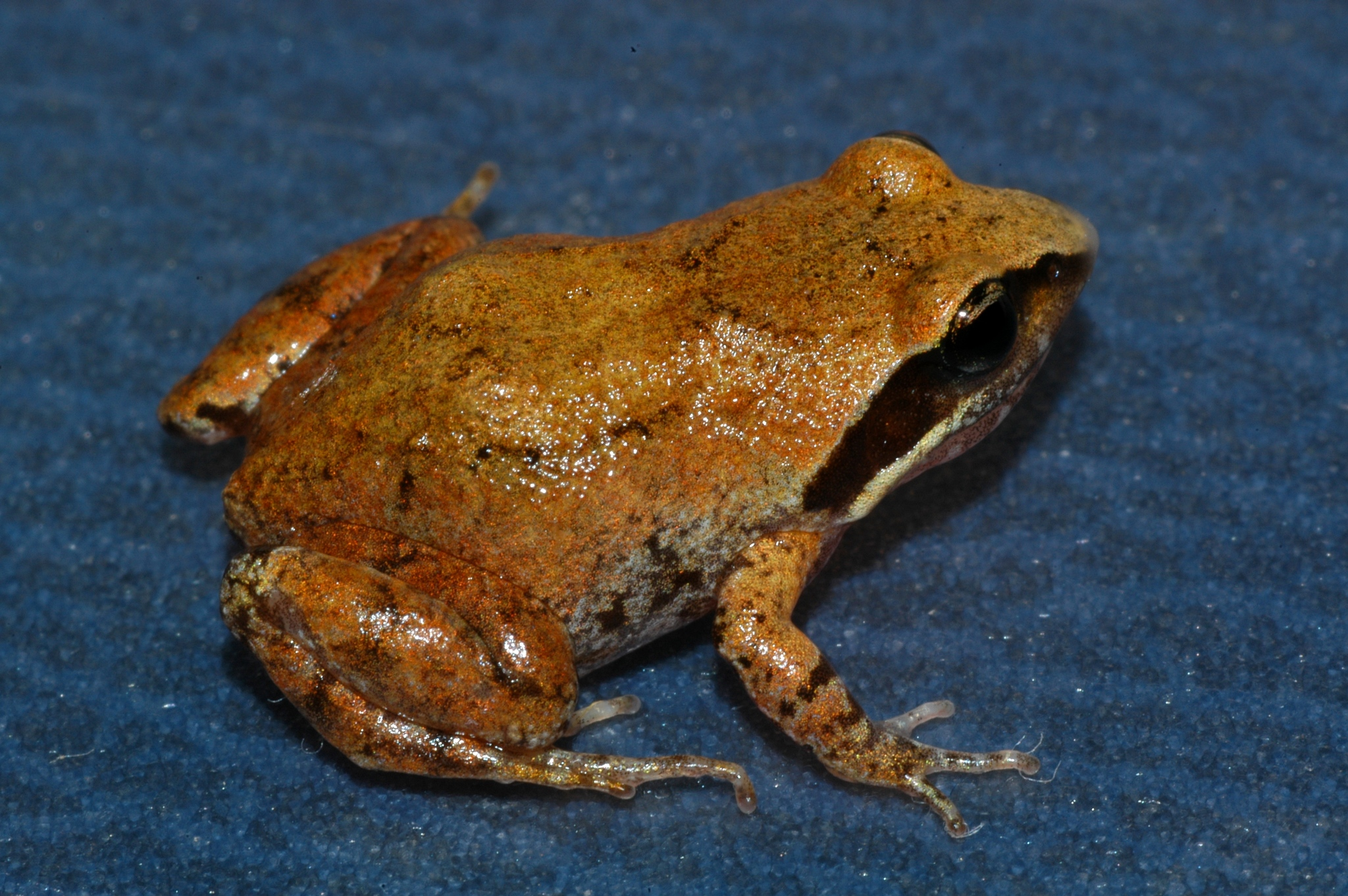
- Anhydrophryne rattrayi

Scientific classification
- Kingdom: Animalia
- Phylum: Chordata
- Class: Amphibia
- Order: Anura
- Family: Pyxicephalidae
- Subfamily: Cacosterninae
- Genus: Anhydrophryne; Hewitt, 1919

= Anhydrophryne =

Genus of amphibians

Anhydrophryne is a genus of frogs in the family Pyxicephalidae, formerly in Petropedetidae. It is endemic to South Africa. Until recently, the genus was monotypic, containing only Anhydrophryne rattrayi, until it absorbed two more species formerly classified as belonging to genus Arthroleptella.

== Species ==
The genus contains these species:

- Anhydrophryne hewitti (FitzSimons, 1947) – Hewitt's moss frog
- Anhydrophryne ngongoniensis (Bishop and Passmore, 1993) – Ngoni moss frog
- Anhydrophryne rattrayi Hewitt, 1919 – Hogsback frog
