= Osgood's Ethiopian toad =

Conservation status
- Critically endangered, possibly extinct (IUCN 3.1)
- CITES Appendix I

Scientific classification
- Kingdom: Animalia
- Phylum: Chordata
- Class: Amphibia
- Order: Anura
- Family: Bufonidae
- Genus: Altiphrynoides
- Species: A. osgoodi

Binomial name
- Altiphrynoides osgoodi (Loveridge, 1932)

Synonyms
- Bufo osgoodi Loveridge, 1932; Spinophrynoides osgoodi (Loveridge, 1932)

Species of amphibian

Osgood's Ethiopian toad (Altiphrynoides osgoodi formerly known as Spinophrynoides osgoodi) is a possibly extinct species of toad in the family Bufonidae endemic to the mountains of south-central Ethiopia. It was named for the American biologist Wilfred Hudson Osgood who carried out fieldwork in Ethiopia for the Field Museum in 1926–27. He collected the original specimens of Osgood's Ethiopian toad and three other endemic species of anuran.

== Distribution ==
The toad was common in the Bale Mountains National Park and other montane environments east of the Great Rift Valley, and was also said to be present in an isolated population in the Gughe Mountains, although the existence of this population was based on a single specimen which may have been misidentified. If the putative population in the Gughe mountains is not included then this toad's total range covered an area of 56 km^{2} (22 sq mi).

== Habitat and ecology ==
Osgood's Ethiopian toad is mainly a species of tropical montane forest, possibly extending marginally into open moorland. There is an observation of these toads breeding in a small pool, which was probably temporary, within a grassy glade surrounded by Hypericum woodland during April. Long strings of eggs were laid from which the tadpoles hatched.

== Conservation ==
The toad is rare; the last specimen was observed 2003, despite extensive survey work in 2009. If it is still extant, it probably numbers no more than 50 individuals. It is threatened by habitat loss by subsistence exploitation of the forests. Chytrid fungus is very prevalent in amphibians in highland Ethiopia although there is no data on its impact on this species.
