= Nectophrynoides cryptus =

Conservation status
- Endangered (IUCN 3.1)
- CITES Appendix I

Scientific classification
- Kingdom: Animalia
- Phylum: Chordata
- Class: Amphibia
- Order: Anura
- Family: Bufonidae
- Genus: Nectophrynoides
- Species: N. cryptus

Binomial name
- Nectophrynoides cryptus Perret, 1971

Species of amphibian

Nectophrynoides cryptus is a species of toad in the family Bufonidae. It is endemic to the Uluguru Mountains, Tanzania. Its natural habitat is subtropical or tropical moist lowland forests. It is threatened by habitat loss.
