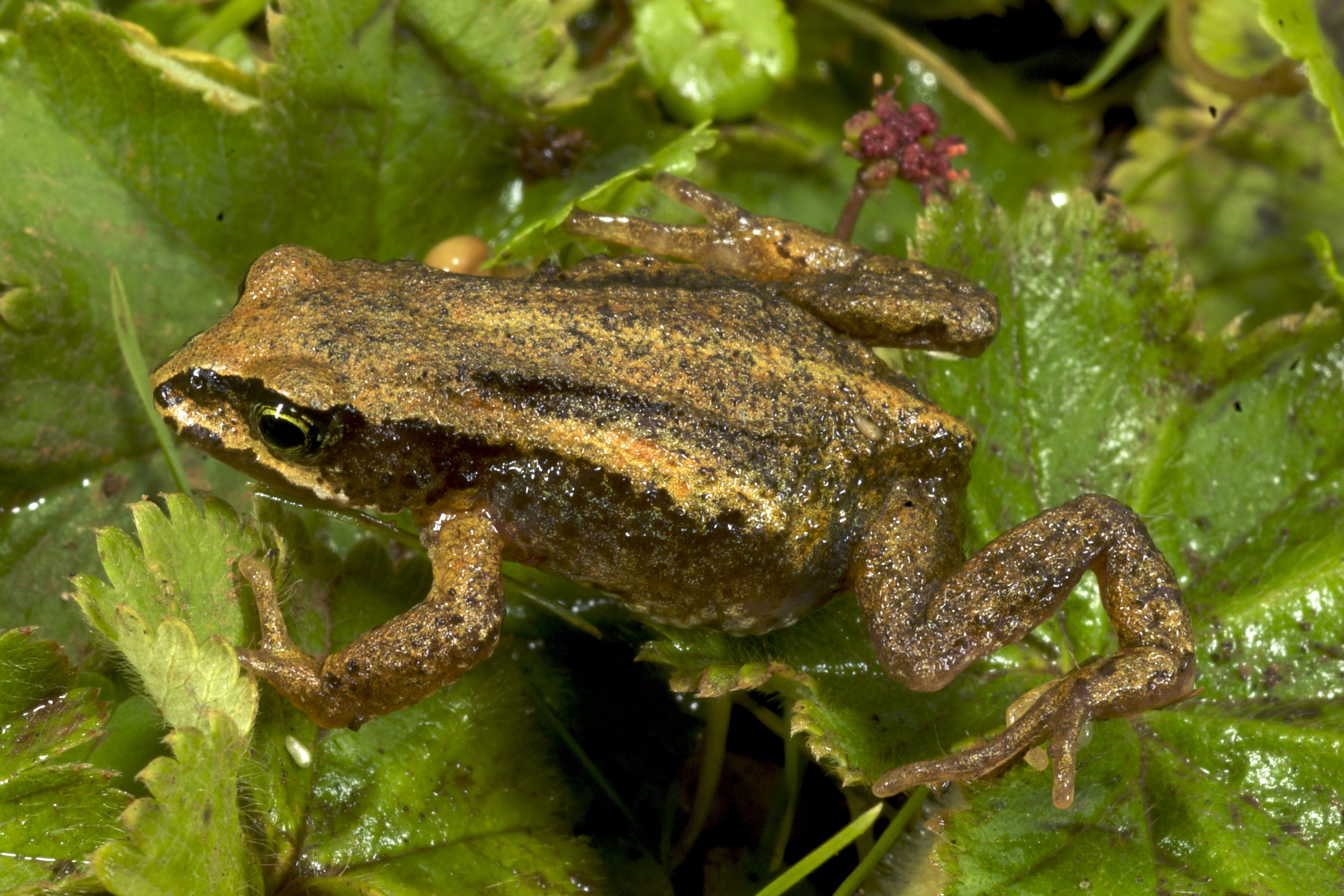

Conservation status
- Endangered (IUCN 3.1)
- CITES Appendix I

Scientific classification
- Kingdom: Animalia
- Phylum: Chordata
- Class: Amphibia
- Order: Anura
- Family: Bufonidae
- Genus: Altiphrynoides
- Species: A. malcolmi

Binomial name
- Altiphrynoides malcolmi (Grandison, 1978)

= Malcolm's Ethiopian toad =

Species of amphibian

Malcolm's Ethiopian toad or the Ethiopian mountain toad (Altiphrynoides malcolmi) is a species of toad in the family Bufonidae endemic to the Bale Mountains of Ethiopia. Its natural habitats are Astropanax–Hagenia–Hypericum montane forests and Afro-alpine moorland, and the transition zone in between. It is threatened by habitat loss and is listed by the IUCN as being an "endangered species".

== Description ==
Malcolm's Ethiopian toad is a small robust species. The females reach a snout-to-vent length of 32 mm (1.3 in) and males reach 21 mm (0.8 in) in length. The head is broad and the upper jaw is longer than the lower one. The paratoid gland is some way behind the eye and is short and narrow. The colour of the upper parts is quite variable with different individuals being greenish-grey, grey, greyish-brown or black. There are dark spots arranged along three longitudinal bands of paler colour, pink, dull red or green. The flanks are grey or greyish-black and may be delineated by a thin white line. The underparts are cream or dull white with darker spots and blotches.

== Distribution ==
Malcolm's Ethiopian toad is endemic to the Bale Mountains of Ethiopia where it is found at elevations of between 3,200 and 4,000 metres (10,500 and 13,100 ft) above sea level. At lower elevations it is found in grassy meadows besides streams but higher up on the mountain plateau it is present in forests composed of Astropanax, Hagenia and Hypericum and also on afromontane moorlands.

== Biology ==
Malcolm's Ethiopian toad has what is believed to be a unique pattern of development. Males advertise their presence with calls that are only audible within a few meters. Both males and females wander through wet grasses near streams and pools until they meet, after which the male calls more intensely. Other males congregate at the site and there is great competition to mate with the female. Fertilization is internal and takes place after the successful couple engage in face-to-face amplexus. The female produces about twenty large eggs enclosed in a mucus layer while still in amplexus. These are deposited in the vegetation or occasionally under logs or in leaf litter. The female then departs the scene but the males remain and attract more females by their calling. These lay their eggs at the same site and the communal egg mass may originate from as many as twenty females. The males eventually disperse when no more females arrive. There is no more parental involvement and the eggs develop into non-feeding tadpoles which rely on the large yolk-sac in the egg. In the laboratory eggs have hatched after eleven days but in the field, at a lower temperature, this is likely to take longer. By the time they hatch, the tadpoles have started reabsorbing their tails but metamorphosis is completed after hatching.

== Status ==
Although Malcolm's Ethiopian toad is common in some localities within its range, the population trend is believed to be downward. The main threats faced by this toad are the degradation of its habitat through timber extraction, increased grazing of cattle and the development of settlements, although part of its range is within the Bale Mountains National Park which should offer some protection from human activities. The fungus causing chytridiomycosis is present in the Ethiopian highlands and has been found to occur in this species. For these reasons, the International Union for Conservation of Nature has listed this toad as being an "endangered species".
