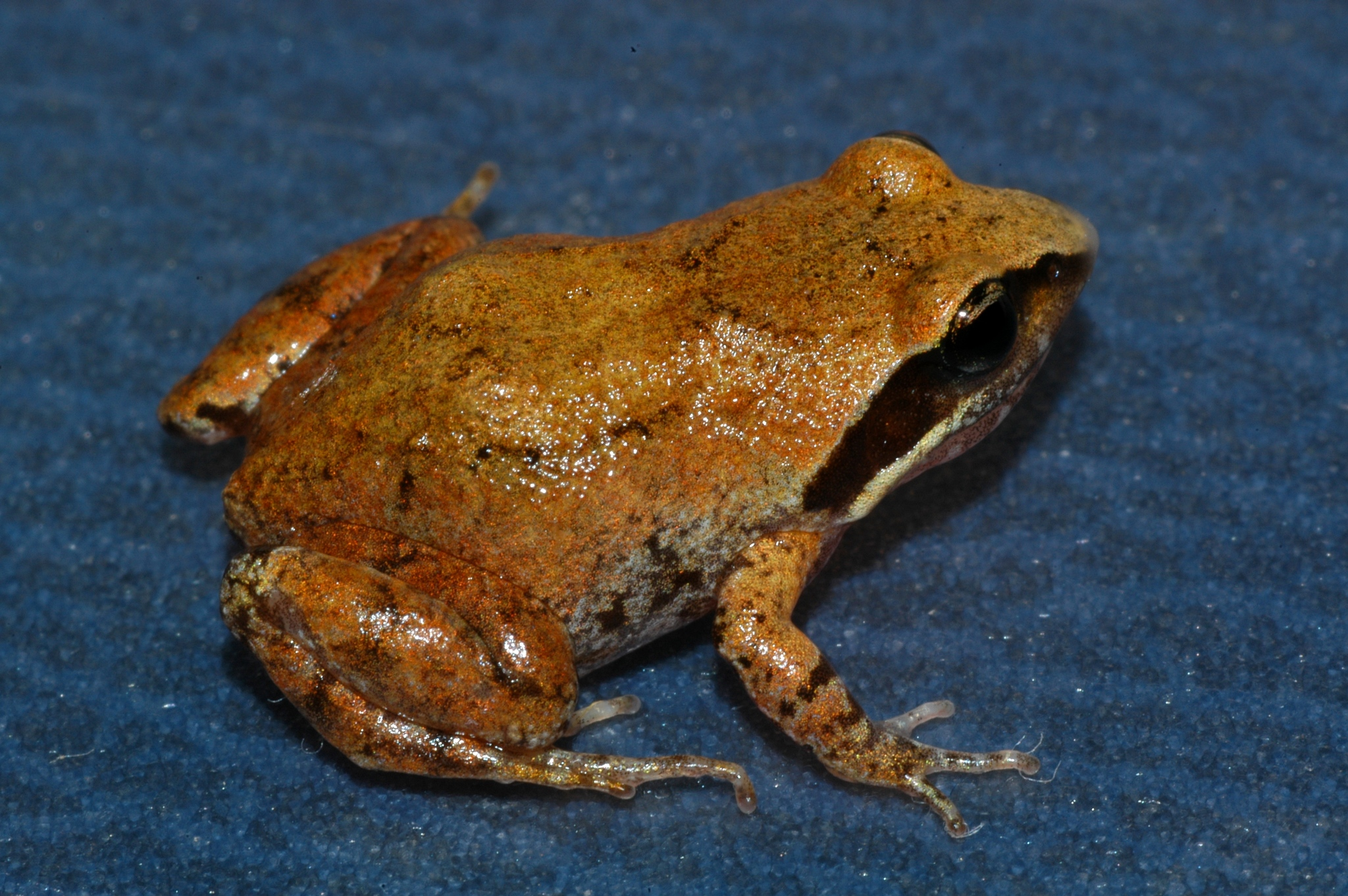

Conservation status
- Endangered (IUCN 3.1)

Scientific classification
- Kingdom: Animalia
- Phylum: Chordata
- Class: Amphibia
- Order: Anura
- Family: Pyxicephalidae
- Genus: Anhydrophryne
- Species: A. rattrayi

Binomial name
- Anhydrophryne rattrayi Hewitt, 1919

= Hogsback frog =

Species of amphibian

The Hogsback frog (Anhydrophryne rattrayi), or Rattray's forest frog, is a species of frog in the family Pyxicephalidae. It is one of three species within the genus Anhydrophryne. It is endemic to the Eastern Cape province of South Africa.

== Discovery ==
This frog was initially discovered by Dr. George Rattray in the Hogsback Mountain region of the Eastern Cape, South Africa, and was described as a new species by John Hewitt in 1919.

== Distribution and habitat ==
The frog is found in the Amotola (where the type locality, Hogsback is located), Katberg and Keiskammahoek mountains. Its habitat is the floor of forests near the forest edge at an altitude greater than 1,100 m (3,600 ft). It is particularly associated with the forest–grassland ecotone.

== Biology ==
These small frogs are light-grey to dark-brown (sometimes coppery) in colour. The adult often has a thin pale line over its head and back, with two darker bands along either side. The belly is marbled (white and dark brown to black.) The female of the species is about 21 mm long. The male is considerably smaller and may be distinguished by a horny tip on its snout. The males have a short 'ping' call with up to 15 repeats in rapid succession, though single 'pings' may also be heard. These calls are typically heard at night, though the males are also active on rainy days.

The frogs live on the forest floor among damp vegetable debris, particularly near open water. Their diets are principally composed of small arthropods, e.g. forest fleas and woodlice.

Eggs are large (about 2.6 mm in diameter), white, and enclosed in a jelly capsule about 6 mm in size. Up to 20 such eggs are laid in a nest chamber, the diameter of which is around 20 mm, with a 10-mm opening to the surface. The opening is covered with leaves. The male is believed to dig the nest. Unusual amongst amphibians, they have direct development where eggs develop to small froglets without free-living tadpole stage. The nest needs to remain moist for successful development. The eggs take 26 days to develop and metamorphose, at which stage they leave the nest as 4-mm froglets.

== Conservation ==
Due to its declining natural habitat, the Hogsback frog is currently classified as endangered.
