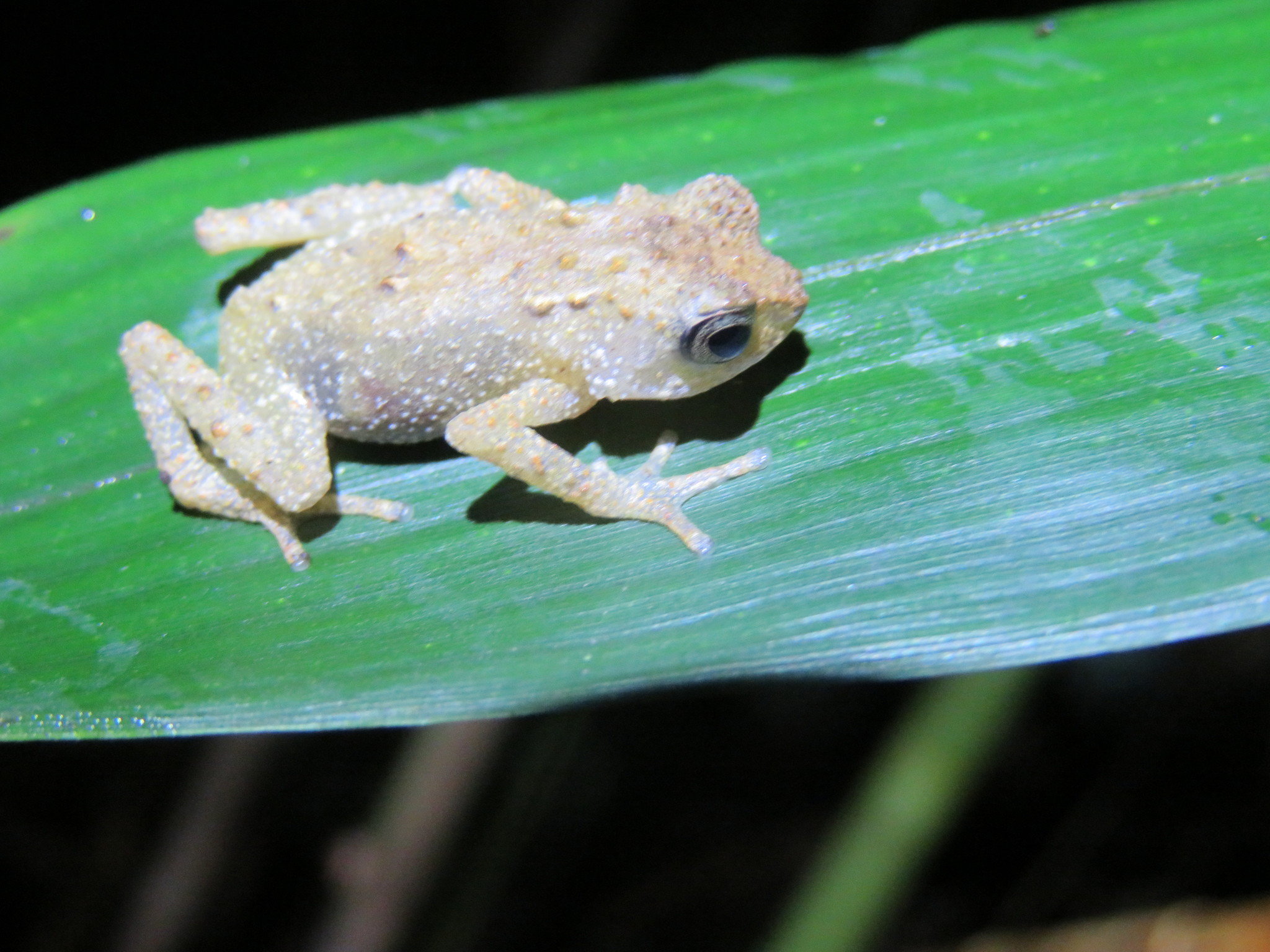
- Female
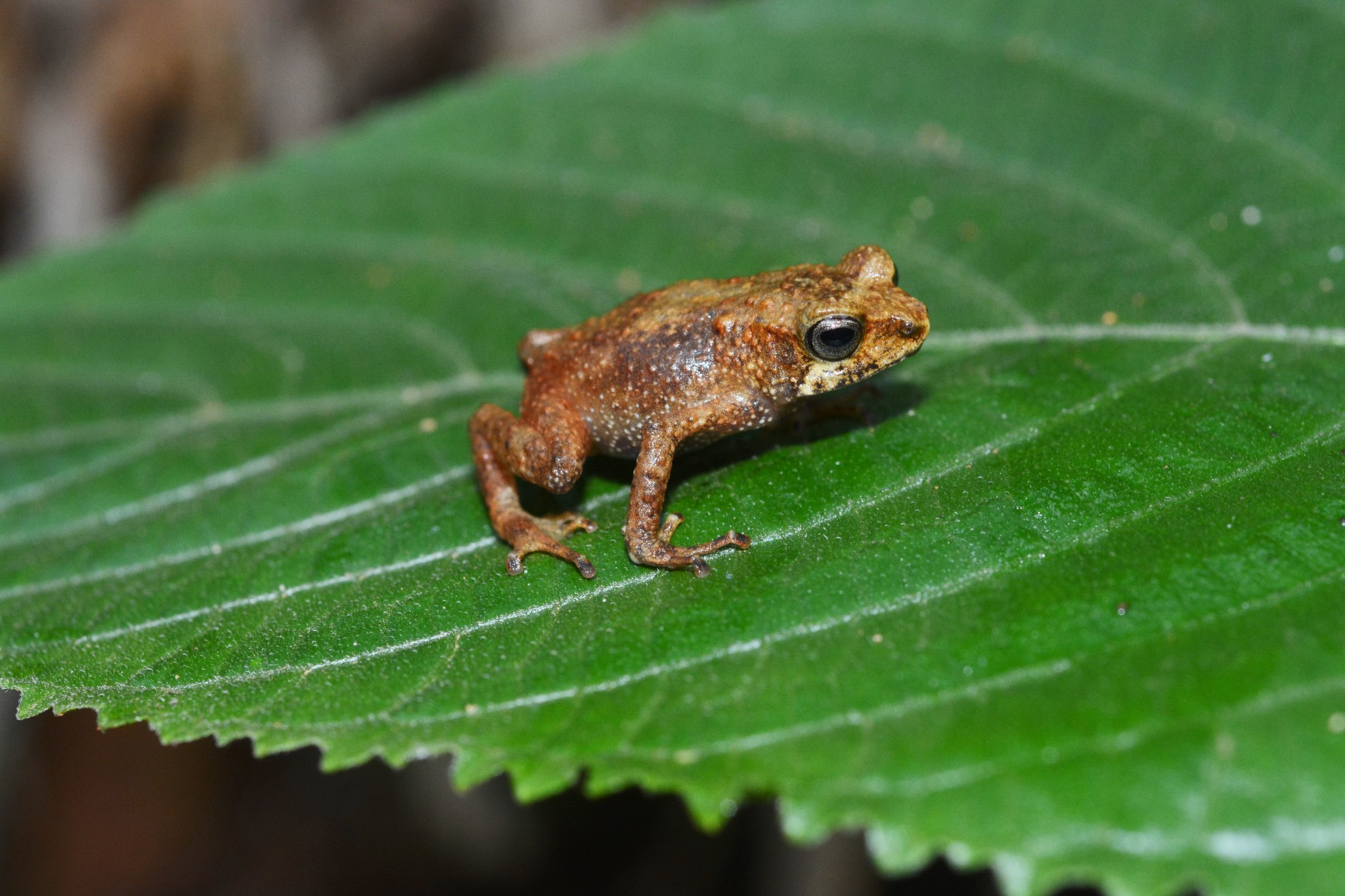
- Male

Conservation status
- Least Concern (IUCN 3.1)
- CITES Appendix I

Scientific classification
- Kingdom: Animalia
- Phylum: Chordata
- Class: Amphibia
- Order: Anura
- Family: Bufonidae
- Genus: Nectophrynoides
- Species: N. tornieri

Binomial name
- Nectophrynoides tornieri (Roux, 1906)

Synonyms
- Nectophryne tornieri Roux, 1906

= Nectophrynoides tornieri =

Species of amphibian

Nectophrynoides tornieri, Tornier's forest toad or kijula, is a species of toad in the family Bufonidae. It is endemic to Tanzania. This species was first described by Jean Roux in 1906 and was named in honour of the German zoologist Gustav Tornier.

== Description ==
Tornier's forest toad is sexually dimorphic and the colouring also varies considerably between individuals. The males are smaller at 28 mm (1.1 in), with the dorsal surface brownish-red and the ventral surface grey or white. The females measure 34 mm (1.3 in) in length with the dorsal surface rust coloured with a central yellow region and a ventral surface that appears translucent. Females may also have two black bands across the lower legs and feet. The fingers on both sexes have expanded, flattened blunt pads.

== Distribution and habitat ==
Tornier's forest toad is endemic to the Eastern Arc Mountains in southern and eastern Tanzania. It is found in the forests and in agricultural areas adjoining forests at altitudes between 300 and 1,800 metres (980 and 5,910 ft) above sea level. It is a terrestrial species and clambers about in low vegetation, forages on the ground and hides under leaf litter.

== Diet ==
Tornier's forest toad eats small invertebrates such as ants.

== Mating and reproduction ==
Breeding takes place in the rainy season. Males advertise themselves to attract females by calling at night from low vegetation. While doing this they adopt a characteristic pose with all four limbs extended. Unlike most frogs, this species is viviparous. Internal fertilisation takes place and the eggs, which are 3-4 mm in diameter, develop directly into juvenile frogs in the oviduct of the female. Up to thirty-five offspring have been found developing in one female.

== Status ==
Tornier's forest toad is listed as being of "Least Concern" in the IUCN Red List of Threatened Species. Although it occupies a total range that is smaller than 20,000 square kilometres (7,700 sq mi) it is common in much of this area and is not thought to be in significant decline. It is an adaptable species and when logging has affected its traditional habitat, has moved into agricultural areas and banana plantations. It is also threatened by illegal gold mining.
