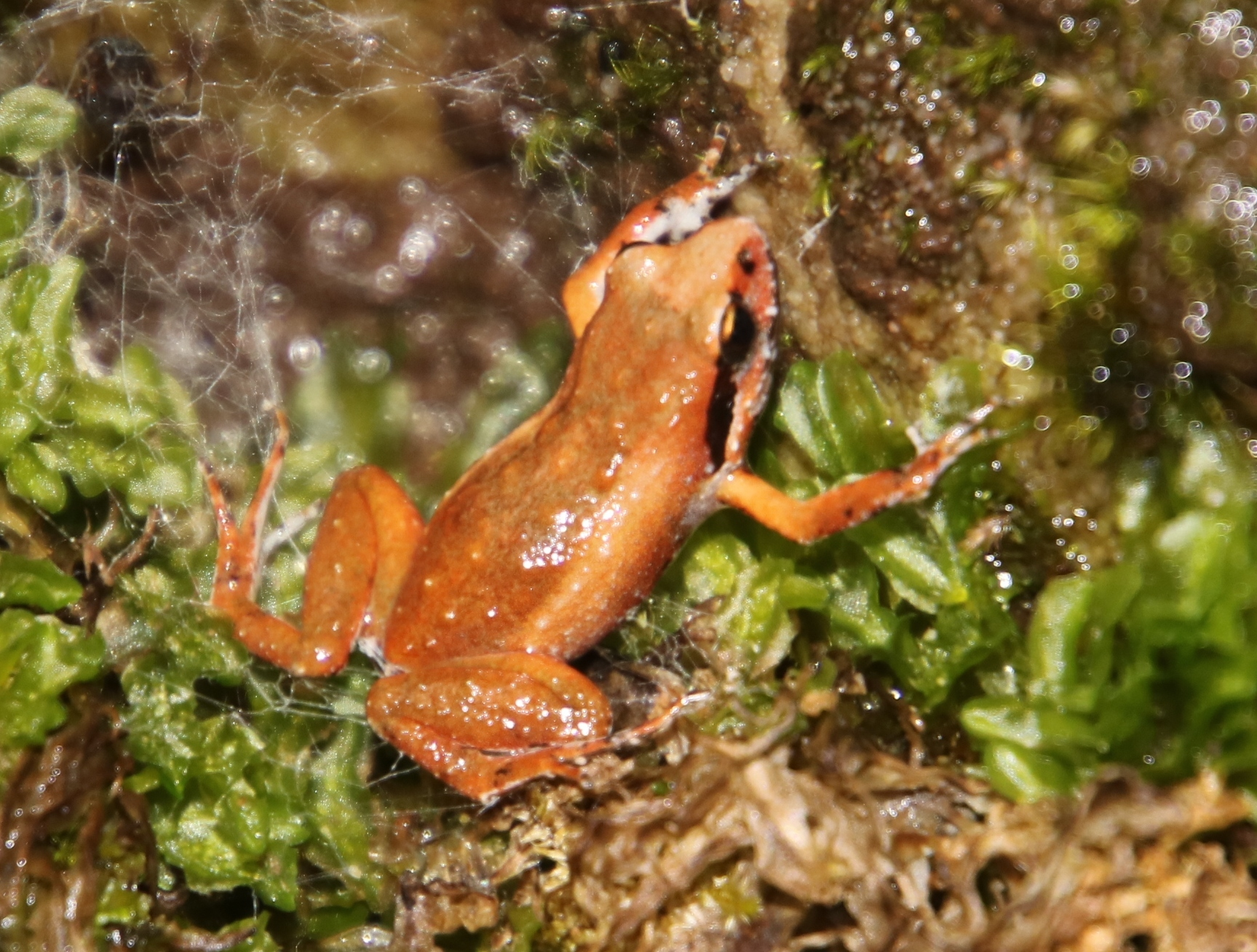
- In Western Cape, South Africa

Conservation status
- Near Threatened (IUCN 3.1)

Scientific classification
- Kingdom: Animalia
- Phylum: Chordata
- Class: Amphibia
- Order: Anura
- Family: Pyxicephalidae
- Genus: Arthroleptella
- Species: A. lightfooti

Binomial name
- Arthroleptella lightfooti (Boulenger, 1910)

= Lightfoot's moss frog =

Species of amphibian

Lightfoot's moss frog or the Cape Peninsula moss frog (Arthroleptella lightfooti) is a species of frog in the family Pyxicephalidae. It is endemic to South Africa. Its natural habitats are temperate forest, Mediterranean-type shrubby vegetation, and rivers. It is threatened by habitat loss.
