= Nectophrynoides minutus =

Conservation status
- Endangered (IUCN 3.1)
- CITES Appendix I

Scientific classification
- Kingdom: Animalia
- Phylum: Chordata
- Class: Amphibia
- Order: Anura
- Family: Bufonidae
- Genus: Nectophrynoides
- Species: N. minutus

Binomial name
- Nectophrynoides minutus Perret, 1972

Species of amphibian

Nectophrynoides minutus is a species of toad in the family Bufonidae. It is endemic to Tanzania and is known from the Uluguru and Rubeho Mountains. Common names small viviparous toad, minute tree toad, and dwarf forest toad have been proposed for it.

== Description ==
Males grow to 19 mm (0.7 in) and females to 22 mm (0.9 in) in snout–vent length. The tympanum is visible. No parotoid glands are present. The finger and toe tips lack discs. The fingers have no webbing while the toes have basal webbing. Colouration is brown dorsally. The lower surfaces are white with dark speckles.

Reproduction involves ovoviviparity: there are no free-living larvae, instead, the female gives birth to fully-developed toadlets.

== Habitat and conservation ==
Nectophrynoides minutus occurs in montane rainforest at elevations above 1,200 m (3,900 ft) above sea level. It only occurs in undisturbed forest and is threatened by habitat loss and deterioration caused by agricultural encroachment, wood extraction, and expanding human settlements. However, it is present in the Uluguru Nature Reserve, which is relatively well protected.
