= Nectophrynoides viviparus =

Conservation status
- Least Concern (IUCN 3.1)
- CITES Appendix I

Scientific classification
- Kingdom: Animalia
- Phylum: Chordata
- Class: Amphibia
- Order: Anura
- Family: Bufonidae
- Genus: Nectophrynoides
- Species: N. viviparus

Binomial name
- Nectophrynoides viviparus (Tornier, 1905)

Synonyms
- Pseudophryne vivipara Tornier, 1905; Nectophryne werthi Nieden, 1911 "1910"

Species of amphibian

Nectophrynoides viviparus is a species of toad in the family Bufonidae. It is endemic to Tanzania. Common names robust forest toad and Morogoro tree toad have been coined for it.

== Description ==
Nectophrynoides viviparus is a robust toad which reaches an adult length of 6 centimetres (2.4 in). The skin is smooth and has many small mucous glands. The paratoid glands are prominent just behind the eyes and nearby are circular tympani (eardrums). It also has large glands on its limbs which usually contrast in colour with the rest of the skin. The digits on the hands and feet are partially webbed. Some individuals are black with white markings, others are grey, green or dull red. In 2011, a new species of brevicipitid frog, Callulina meteora, was described from the mountains of Tanzania and has similarly large, contrastingly coloured glands on its limbs.

== Distribution and habitat ==
This species is known from the Uluguru Mountains and Udzungwa Mountains in eastern and southern Tanzania. It occurs in wooded areas, among bamboos and in grassland at the edges of forests at an altitude of between 1,350 and 2,800 metres (4,430 and 9,190 ft) above sea level.

== Biology ==
Nectophrynoides viviparus is a terrestrial species and is ovoviviparous, which implies that it does not require a body of water in which to reproduce. Fertilisation is internal and the eggs develop through the larval stage inside the mother's oviduct, eventually emerging as fully formed juvenile toads.

== Status ==
It is found as several separate populations in an area of about 55,000 square kilometres (21,000 sq mi). It is threatened by habitat loss caused by agricultural activity, wood collection, and human habitations, especially at lower altitudes. Although relatively common, populations in general appear to be declining.
