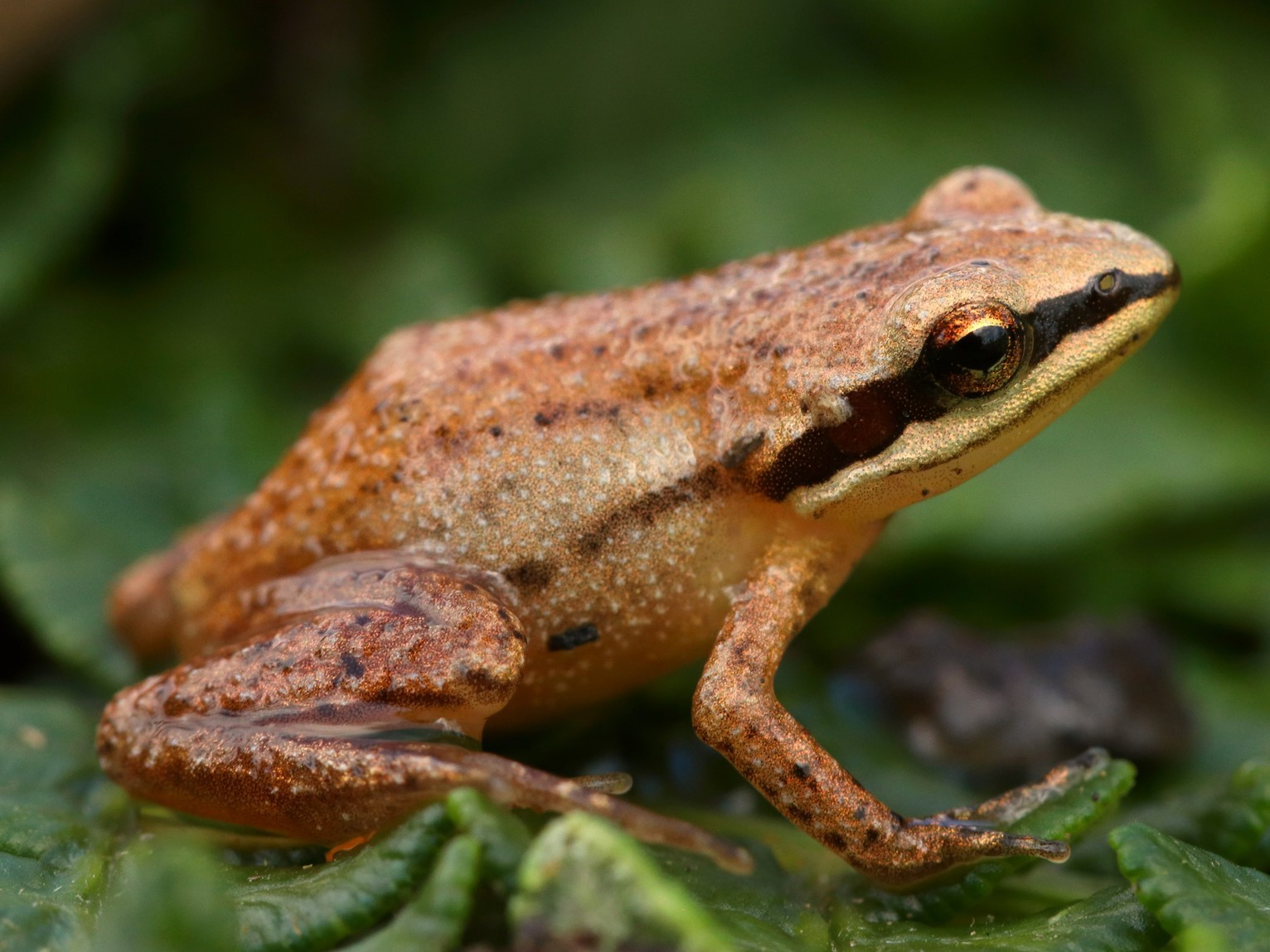

Conservation status
- Endangered (IUCN 3.1)

Scientific classification
- Kingdom: Animalia
- Phylum: Chordata
- Class: Amphibia
- Order: Anura
- Family: Pyxicephalidae
- Genus: Anhydrophryne
- Species: A. ngongoniensis

Binomial name
- Anhydrophryne ngongoniensis (Bishop & Passmore, 1993)

Synonyms
- Arthroleptella ngongoniensis Bishop & Passmore, 1993

= Anhydrophryne ngongoniensis =

Ngongoni moss frog

Species of amphibian

Anhydrophryne ngongoniensis, the Ngongoni moss frog, Natal bandit frog, or mistbelt chirping frog (and many combinations of the previous), is a species of frog in the family Pyxicephalidae. It is endemic to South Africa.

Anhydrophryne ngongoniensis inhabit montane forest and, to a lesser extent, high-altitude grassland. The habitat of this species is being lost rapidly because of afforestation, the spread of invasive wattle trees, and inappropriate fire regimes.

== Distribution ==
This tiny frog is restricted to an extremely small range, on grassy slopes in indigenous grasses of hills facing the ocean. The eastern escarpment of the Drakensberg Mountains is on the windward side and receives cool moist air so that it could be said to be in a permanent mist belt. It hides in the base of grass tussocks.

== Description and discovery ==
It is small (1.6–1.8 cm) sandy/golden brown frog with four broken stripes of darker brown down the back extending onto the limbs. A very distinct fifth line runs from the tip of the snout through the eyes and ear to just behind the tympanum. The frog was discovered serendipitously by P Bishop whilst carrying out his doctoral research on Hyperolius phonotaxis and the type specimens were first taken at Ixopo KZN. It is a cryptic species identified from others by its call. Bishop noticed the call whilst listening for and taking recordings of frog calls. It was originally described in the genus Arthroleptella. It was placed in Anhydrophryne by Darrel Frost in 2012.

== Voice, courtship and breeding ==
The male calls from the base of grass tussocks during the day in poor light and from more exposed or elevated positions at night. It emits a shrill cricket like call. As the name of the genus implies it breeds and lays eggs without the need for standing water. About a dozen large opaque eggs are laid that develop into fully formed translucent froglets (0.4 cm long) in 27–28 days.

== Conservation ==
This species due its tiny distribution and habitat range is vulnerable. The habitat is being lost rapidly because of afforestation, including the spread of invasive wattle trees, bush-fires and inappropriate fire regimes.
