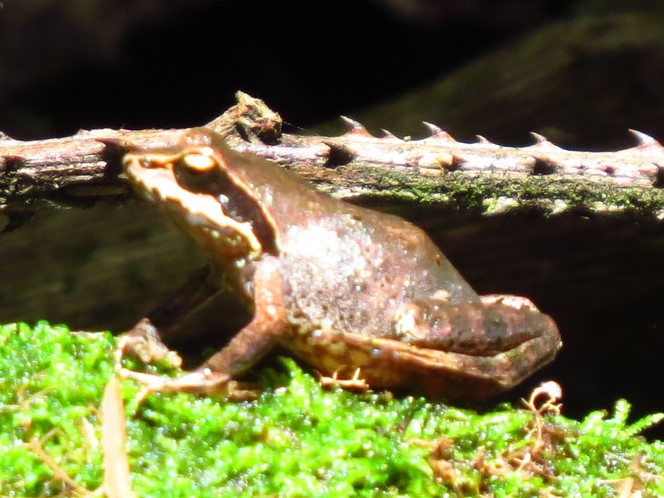

Conservation status
- Least Concern (IUCN 3.1)

Scientific classification
- Kingdom: Animalia
- Phylum: Chordata
- Class: Amphibia
- Order: Anura
- Family: Pyxicephalidae
- Genus: Anhydrophryne
- Species: A. hewitti

Binomial name
- Anhydrophryne hewitti FitzSimons, 1947

Synonyms
- Arthroleptella hewitti FitzSimons, 1947

= Hewitt's moss frog =

Species of amphibian

Hewitt's moss frog (Anhydrophryne hewitti), also known as Natal chirping frog or yellow bandit frog, is a species of frog in the Pyxicephalidae family. It is found in the Drakensberg mountains of South Africa, possibly including adjacent Lesotho.

Anhydrophryne hewitti populations are small and fragmented, found in pockets of forest and dense vegetation. Breeding takes place in wet mossy areas near waterfalls and rapids. Eggs are laid in moss and leaf-litter. The eggs develop directly without a free-living tadpole stage.
