= Alan Channing =

British–South African herpetologist (born 1948)

Alan Eric Channing
- Born: September 26, 1948 (age 77); Newton Abbot, Devon, England
- Education: University of Natal
- Known for: Taxonomy of southern African amphibians
- Scientific career
- Fields: Herpetology
- Thesis: Ecological and systematic relationships in Natal ranids (Rana Linn. sensu stricto and sensu Strongylopus Tschudi), with notes on a possible competitor, the leptodactylid Heleophryne natalensis Hewitt (1977)
- Doctoral advisor: Eddie van Dijk

Alan Eric Channing (born 26 September 1948) is a British–South African herpetologist.

== Biography ==
Born in England, Channing emigrated to South Africa with his family in 1955. In 1974, under the supervision of Neville Passmore, he received a Master of Science degree from the University of Natal for his thesis Low-rainfall-tolerant South African anurans, with particular reference to those of the Namib. In 1977, he received a Ph.D. in zoology from the same university for his dissertation Ecological and systematic relationships in Natal ranids (Rana Linn. sensu stricto and sensu Strongylopus Tschudi), with notes on a possible competitor, the leptodactylid Heleophryne natalensis Hewitt, supervised by Eddie van Dijk. He subsequently worked as a curator at the John R. Ellerman Museum of the University of Stellenbosch. In 1981, he became a professor in the Department of Biodiversity & Conservation Biology at the University of the Western Cape in Bellville, Cape Town. In January 2018, he became a professor at North-West University in Potchefstroom.

Channing's research focuses on the taxonomy of southern African amphibians and the tadpoles of African frogs. He has described more than 140 new species and genera of frogs, including Churamiti, Poyntonia, Ptychadena mutinondoensis, Hyperolius lupiroensis, Breviceps branchi, Ptychadena mapacha, Hyperolius inyangae, Strongylopus springbokensis, Arthroleptella rugosa, and Hyperolius jacobseni.

Channing is a member of the Herpetological Association of Africa, the Zoological Society of Southern Africa, and the California Academy of Sciences.

His books include Amphibians of Central and Southern Africa (2001; revised edition 2019), Amphibians of East Africa (with Kim M. Howell, 2006), Tadpoles of Africa (with Mark-Oliver Rödel, 2012), and Field Guide to the Frogs & Other Amphibians of Africa (with Mark-Oliver Rödel, 2019).

In 2009, Channing served as a scientific adviser for the episode "Drakensberg: Barrier of Spears" of the documentary series Nature.
