= Wildlife of Tanzania =

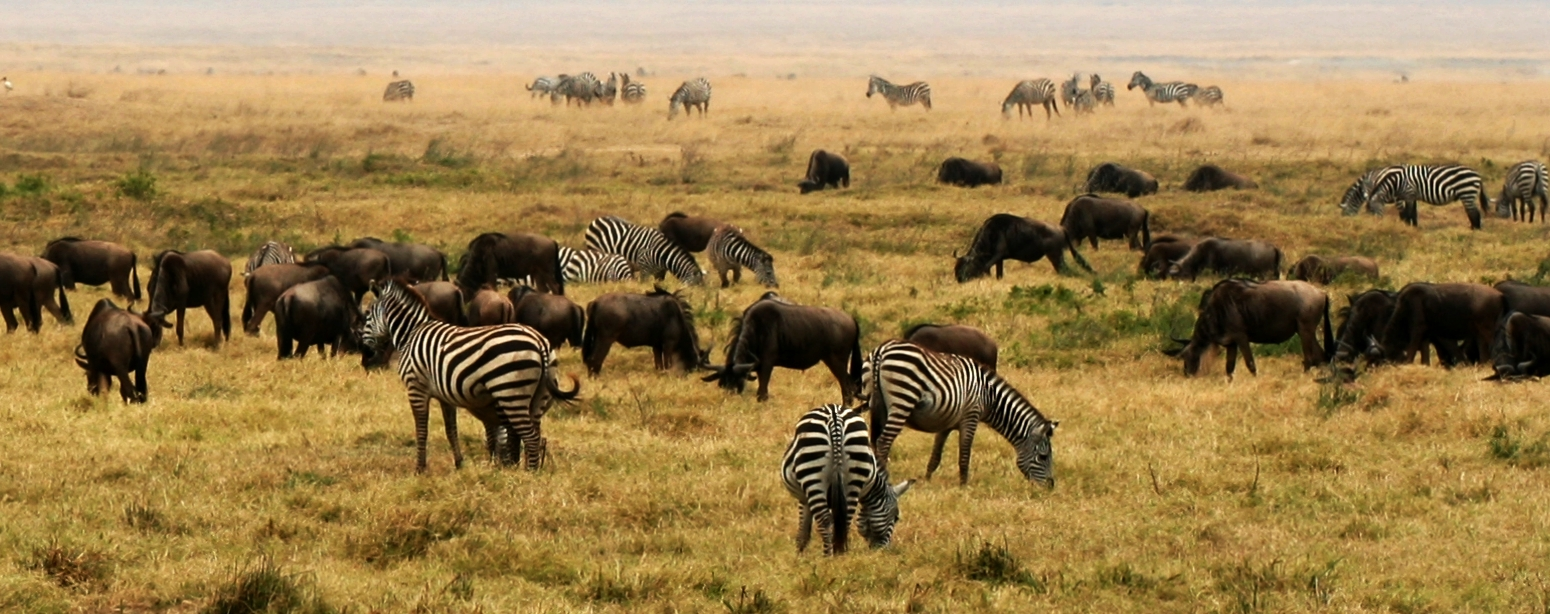
Plains zebra (Equus quagga) and blue wildebeest (Connochaetes taurinus) observed in the Ngorongoro Crater of the Ngorongoro Conservation Area

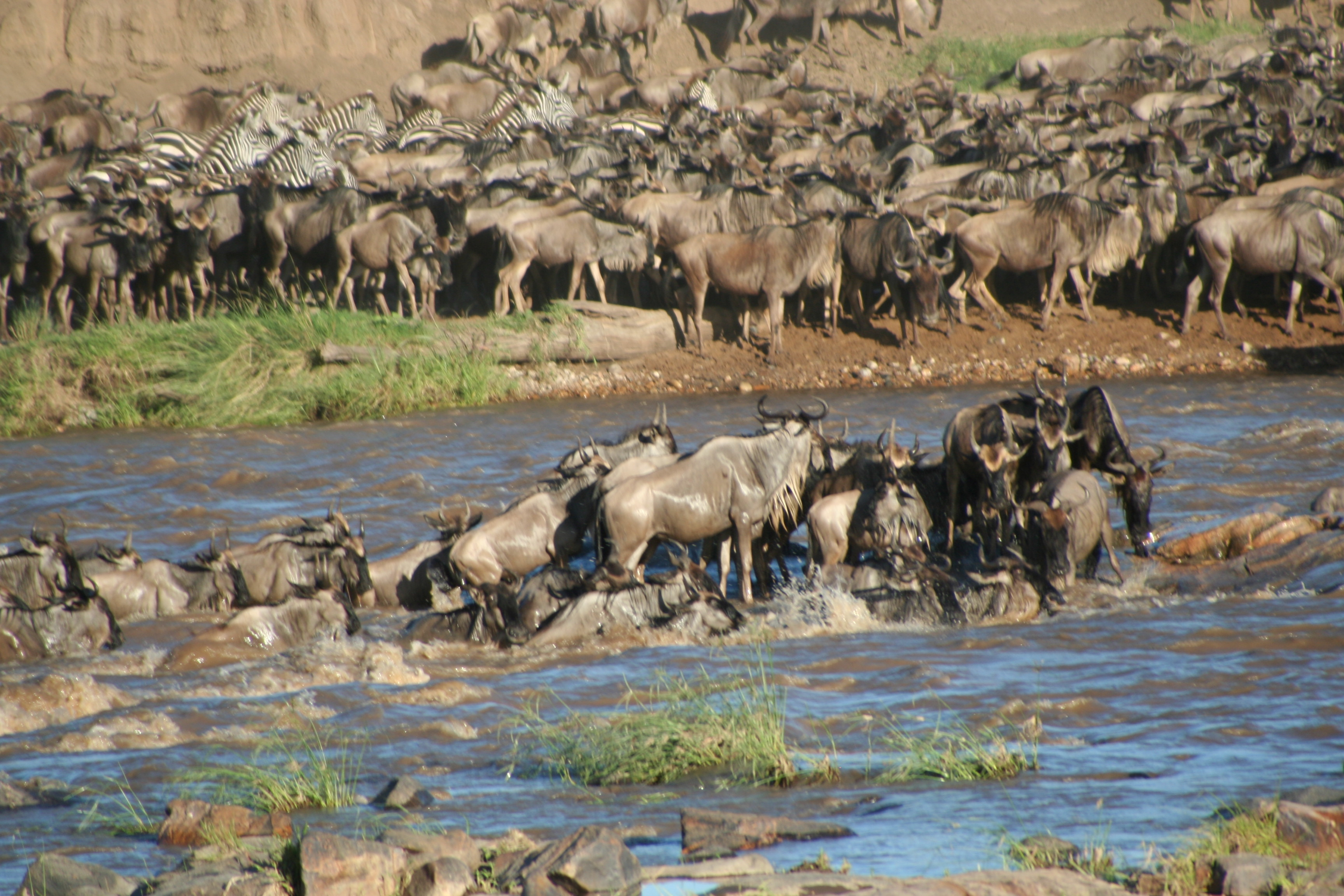
The spectacular mass movement of wildebeests in Tanzania as observed in the Serengeti National Park

Tanzania contains some 20 percent of the species of Africa's large mammal population, found across its reserves, conservation areas, marine parks, and 17 national parks, spread over an area of more than 42,000 square kilometres (16,000 sq mi) and forming approximately 38 percent of the country's territory. Wildlife resources of Tanzania are described as "without parallel in Africa" and "the prime game viewing country". Serengeti National Park, the country's second largest national park area at 14,763 square kilometres (5,700 sq mi), is located in northern Tanzania and is famous for its extensive migratory herds of wildebeests and zebra while also having the reputation as one of the great natural wonders of the world. The Ngorongoro Conservation Area, established in 1959, is a UNESCO World Heritage Site and inhabited by the Maasai people. Its Ngorongoro Crater is the largest intact caldera in the world.

The national parks are also part of the wetlands of Tanzania. The wild animals tend to be closer to the wetlands, particularly the water loving species such as the hippopotamus, waterbuck, common warthog, elephant, crocodile, sitatunga as well as water birds such as flamingoes and ducks.

== Background ==
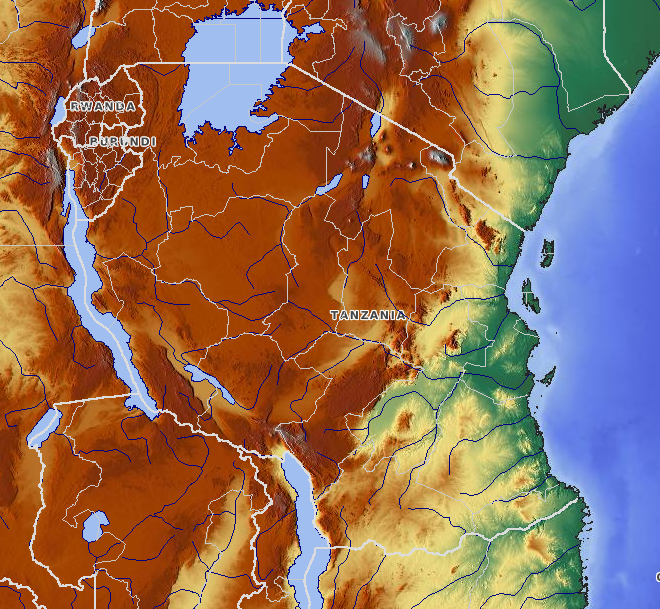
The relief map of Tanzania

Since the colonial era, wildlife conservation in Tanzania has been the prerogative of the government. Under this structure, the use of wildlife resources by local communities had always been restrictive, causing increased rural poverty and poaching. In recent years, the Tanzania National Parks Authority (TANAPA) has initiated corrective actions to involve the local community in conservation efforts, which is aimed at contribution to local economies by way of equitable benefits sharing.

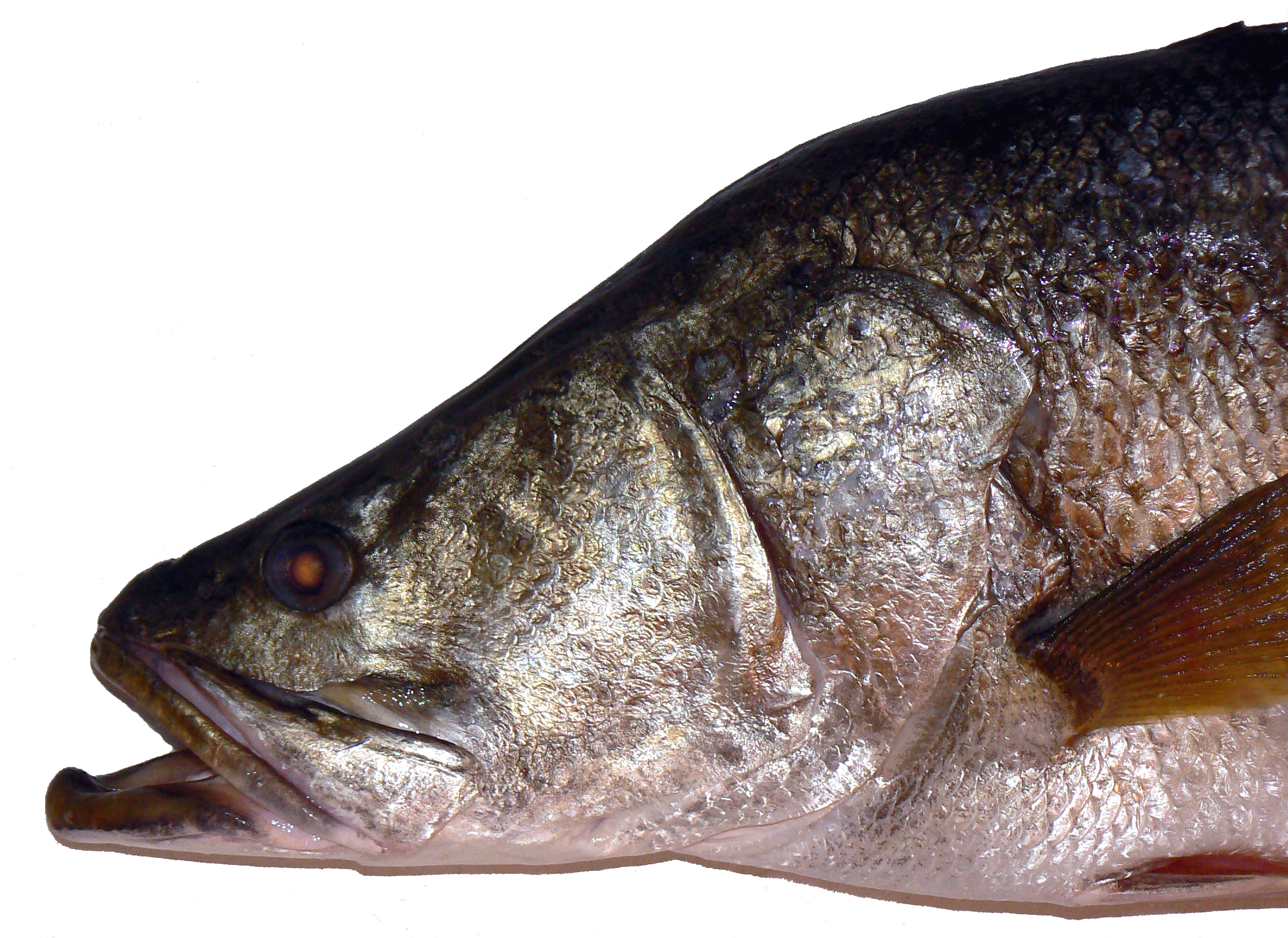
Exports of the Nile perch yield US$100 million annually to Tanzania.

The wildlife resources in Tanzania provide an annual income of US$30 million to the national exchequer, and an income of US$9 million as revenue from the leasing companies. Illegal hunting is estimated to be worth US$50 million. In the 1990s, exports of 1.68 million birds, 523,000 reptiles, 12,000 mammals and 148,000 amphibians occurred, in addition to an increase in wildlife related tourism by about 30%. Fishery resources have also contributed richly to the export revenue of the country, with export value of US$130 million reported in 2003, with the export of the Nile perch accounting for a major share of US$100 million.

== National parks ==
Tanzania’s wildlife, extolled as the "finest safari experiences and wildlife spectacles found anywhere on the planet", has 40 national parks and game reserves. There are 17 national parks covering a total area of 42,235 square kilometres (16,307 sq mi). These parks are as follows:

1. Arusha National Park (552 square kilometres (213 sq mi))
2. Gombe Stream National Park (52 square kilometres (20 sq mi))
3. Jozani Chwaka Bay National Park
4. Katavi National Park (4,471 square kilometres (1,726 sq mi))
5. Kilimanjaro National Park (1,668 square kilometres (644 sq mi))
6. Kitulo National Park (413 square kilometres (159 sq mi))
7. Mahale Mountains National Park (1,613 square kilometres (623 sq mi))
8. Lake Manyara National Park (330 square kilometres (130 sq mi))
9. Mikumi National Park (3,230 square kilometres (1,250 sq mi))
10. Mkomazi National Park (3,245 square kilometres (1,253 sq mi))
11. Ruaha National Park (20,226 square kilometres (7,809 sq mi))
12. Rubondo Island National Park (457 square kilometres (176 sq mi))
13. Saadani National Park (1,062 square kilometres (410 sq mi))
14. Saanane Island National Park (2.18 square kilometres (0.84 sq mi))
15. Serengeti National Park (14,763 square kilometres (5,700 sq mi))
16. Tarangire National Park (2,850 square kilometres (1,100 sq mi))
17. Udzungwa Mountains National Park (1,990 square kilometres (770 sq mi)).

=== Arusha National Park ===
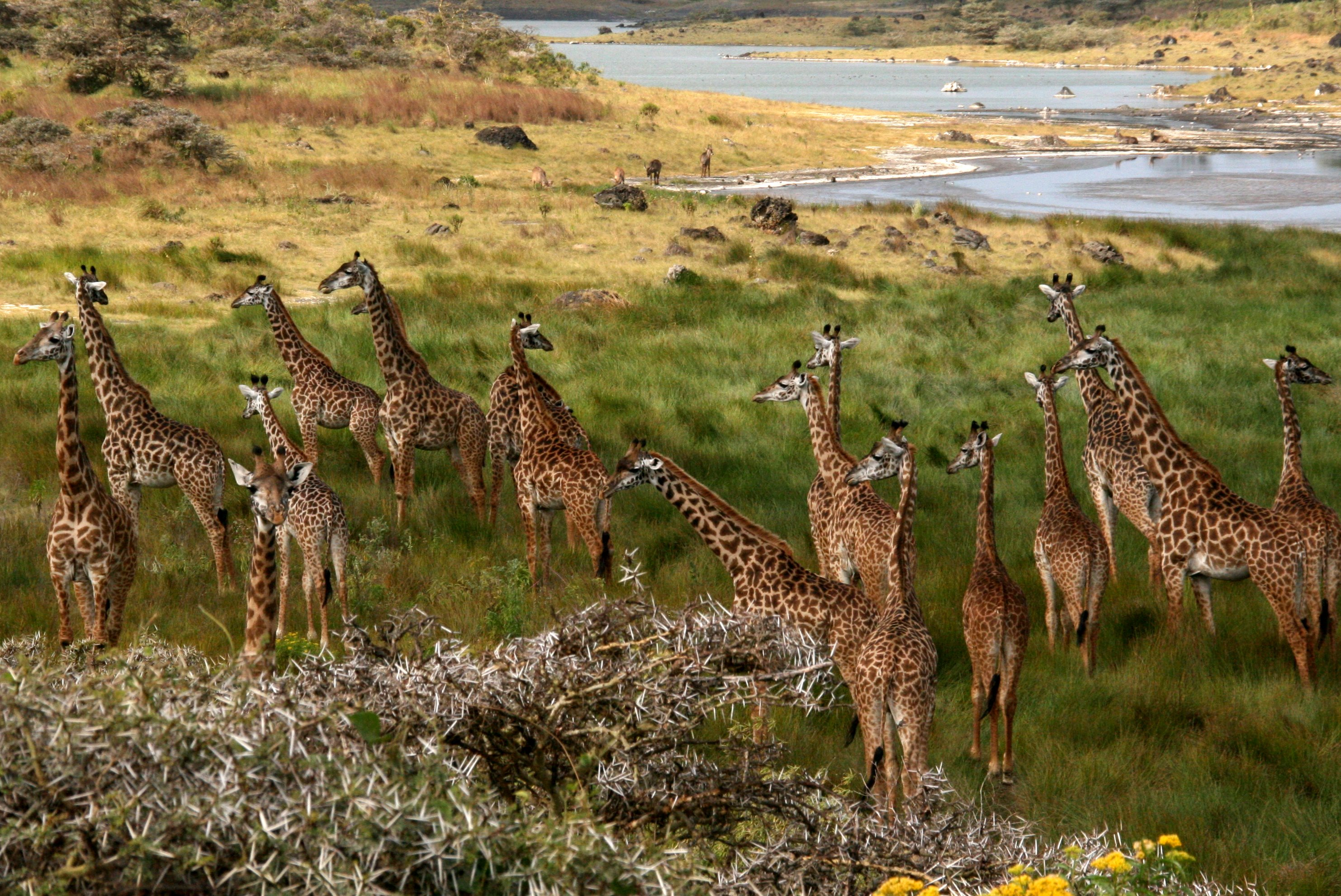
A herd of giraffes observed in the Arusha National Park

Arusha National Park located entirely in Arusha Region is spread over an area of 552 square kilometres (213 sq mi). It is within the riverine, lacustrine, and palustrine wetland ecosystem. It encompasses the montane forests and alpine deserts of Mount Meru, Africa's fifth highest mountain at 4,566 metres (14,980 ft). The park also has marshy areas, rolling grassy hills, and wooded savannah. The Ngurdoto Crater, the Momela Lakes, and one of the sources of the Pangani River are within the park.

Wild animals and birds reported in the park include elephant (uncommon), leopard, waterbuck, spotted hyena, giraffe, blue monkey, colobus monkey, turaco, trogon, African buffalo, warthog, klipspringer, and red-hot poker. Water birds are also concentrated in large numbers in the lake areas, particularly flamingos.

The park is near the city of Arusha, and the Kilimanjaro International Airport is 60 kilometres (37 mi) away.

=== Gombe Stream National Park ===
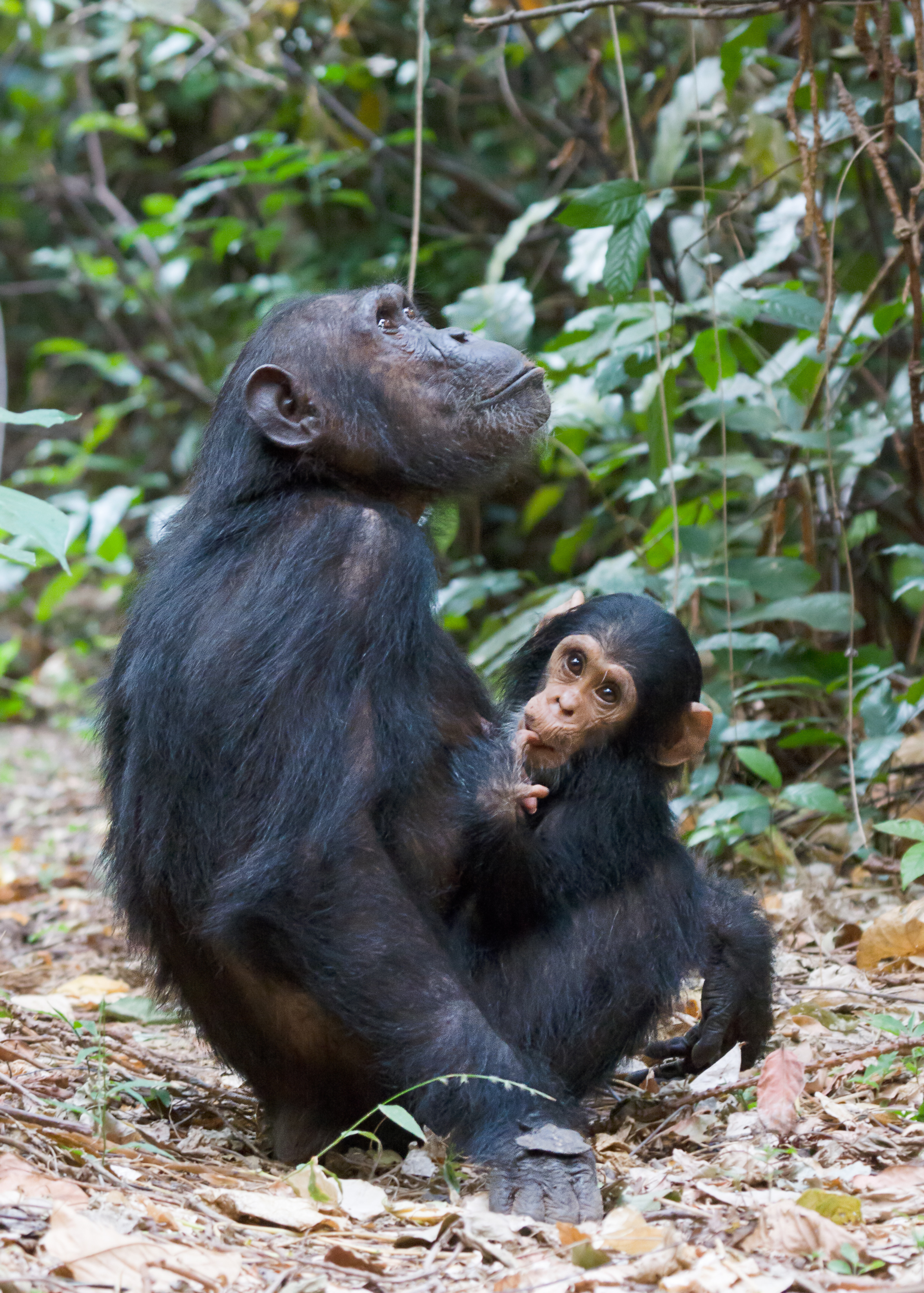
Chimpanzees at Gombe Stream National Park

The second smallest of Tanzania's national parks is Gombe Stream National Park is located in Kigoma District of Kigoma Region, covering an area of only 52 square kilometres (20 sq mi). Its natural topography consists of steep hill slopes, river valleys, and the sandy northern shores of Lake Tanganyika. It is drained by the Gombe River. Access to the park is only through marine vessels from Kigoma.

The celebrated animals in the park are mostly primates, including chimpanzee, beach comber olive baboon, red-tailed monkey, and red colobus monkey. The park is the site of Jane Goodall's ongoing study of chimpanzee behaviour, which started in 1960. The study has reported 150 individuals who are familiar with humans.

The park has a rich bird life with 200 reported bird species, including African fish eagle and red-throated twinspot.

=== Katavi National Park ===
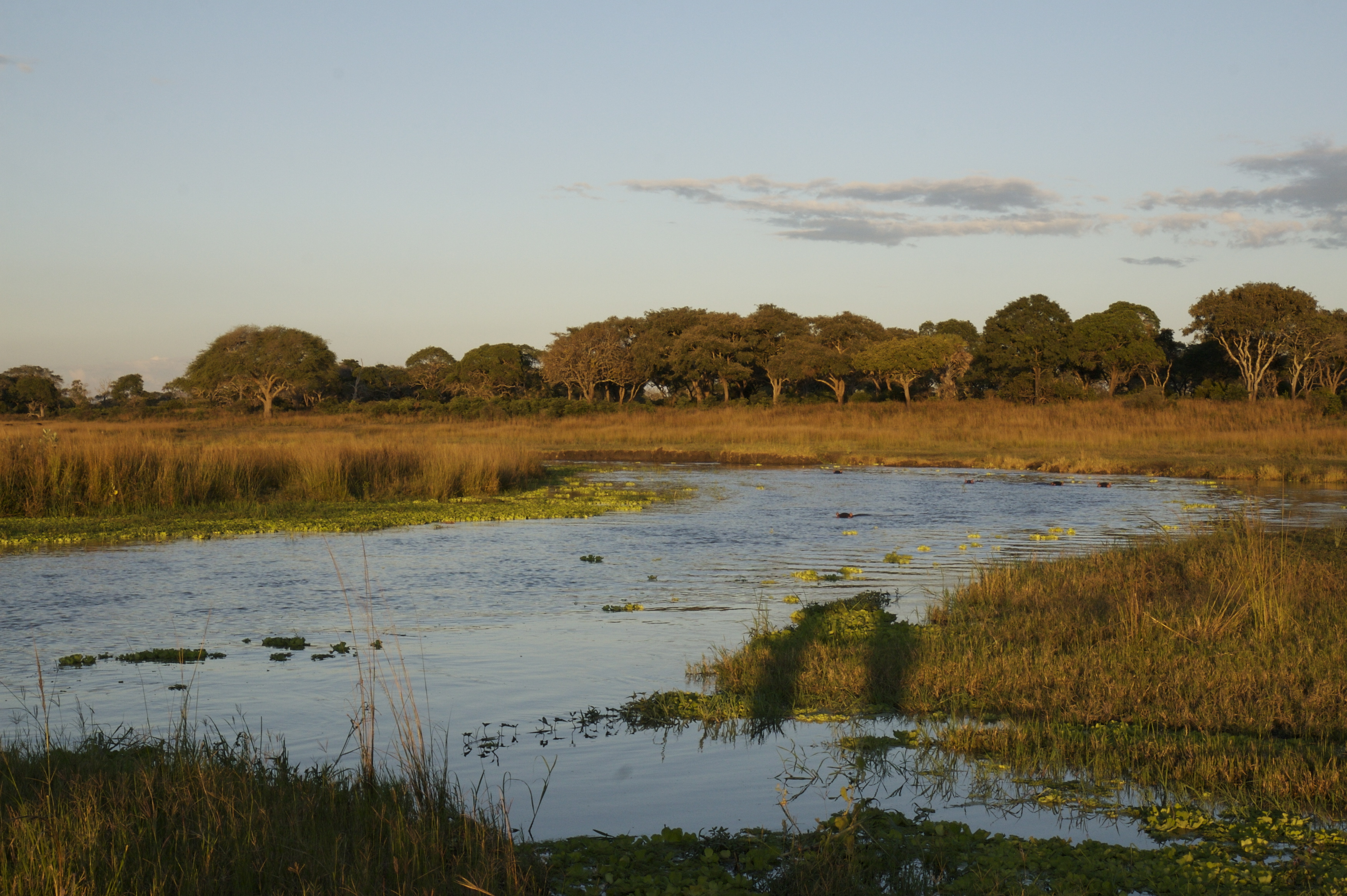
The Katavi National Park at dusk

Katavi National Park, having an area of 4,471 square kilometres (1,726 sq mi), is Tanzania’s third largest national park located in Katavi Region . Its geographic setting is in a truncated arm of the East African Rift that terminates in Lake Rukwa. It is an integral part of the riverine and palustrine wetland ecosystem. The Katuma River and associated floodplains, marshy lakes, and brachystegia woodland are part of its habitat. Eland, sable and roan antelopes are found in substantial numbers, and its marshy lakes have Tanzania's densest population of hippopotamus and Nile crocodile. Elephant, lion, spotted hyena, African buffalo, giraffe, zebra, impala, and reedbuck are a common sight during the dry season.

=== Kilimanjaro National Park ===
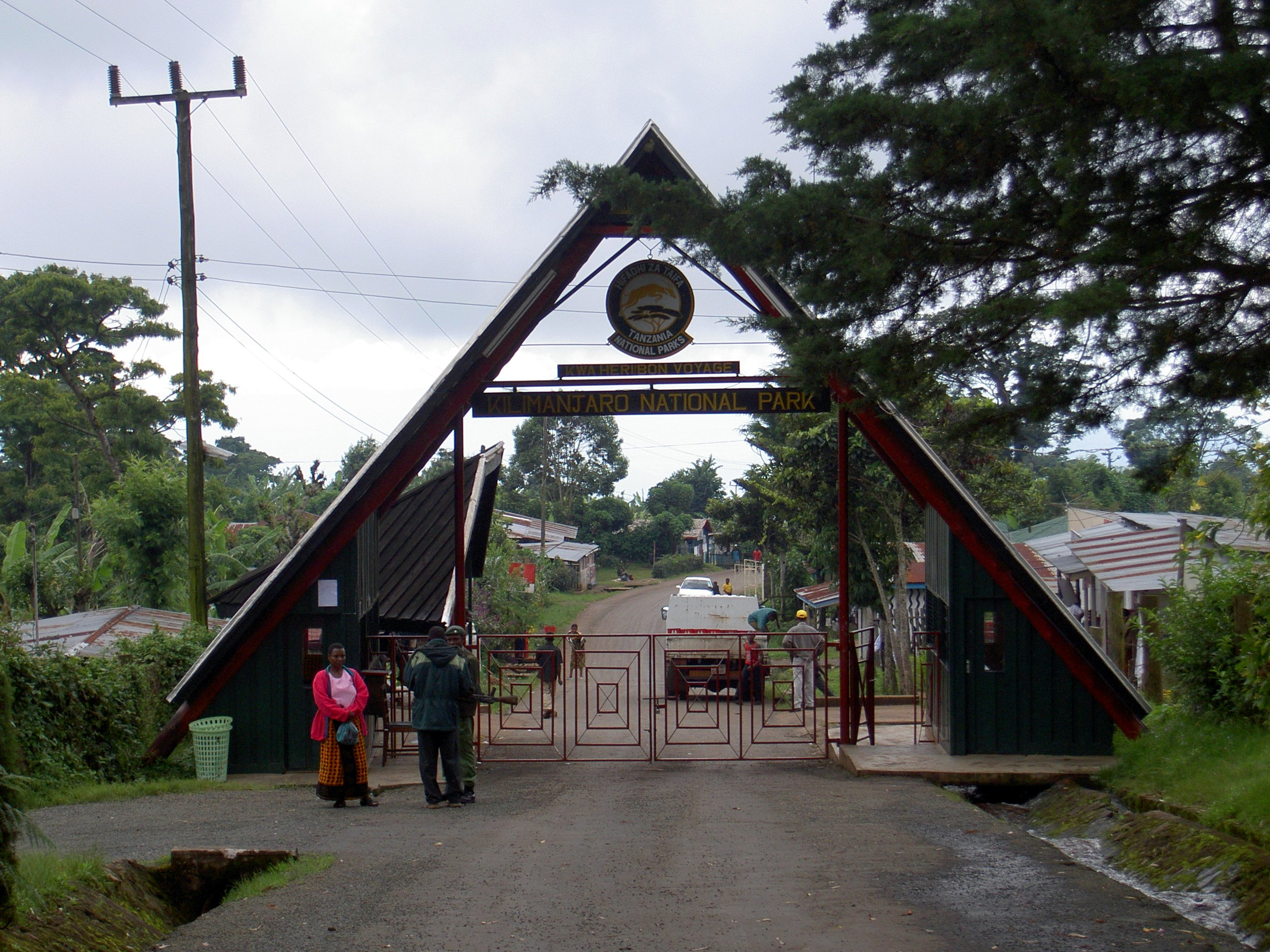
The entrance to the Kilimanjaro National Park, a UNESCO world heritage site

As the name implies, Mount Kilimanjaro gives its name to the park located in Kilimanjaro Region. It is the highest mountain in Africa at 5,895 metres (19,341 ft) and is also the tallest free-standing mountain in the world. The park provides a "climatic world tour, from the tropics to the Arctic". Vegetation in the park includes thick Montane forests, mosses and lichen, and giant lobelias. The park, established in 1977, encompasses an area of 1,668 square kilometres (644 sq mi) and is within the riverine and palustrine ecosystem. Resident wild animals include elephant, leopard, African buffalo, the endangered Abbott's duiker, and other small antelopes and primates. There is hardly any game viewing in this park. However, it is popular for mountaineering expeditions to climb the volcanic cones of Kibo, which has several remnant glaciers, and Mawenzi and to witness the Afro-montane moorland habitat. It is one of the most visited parks in Tanzania. The municipality of Moshi is near several of the park entrances and is 128 square kilometres (49 sq mi) east of the larger city of Arusha.

=== Kitulo National Park ===
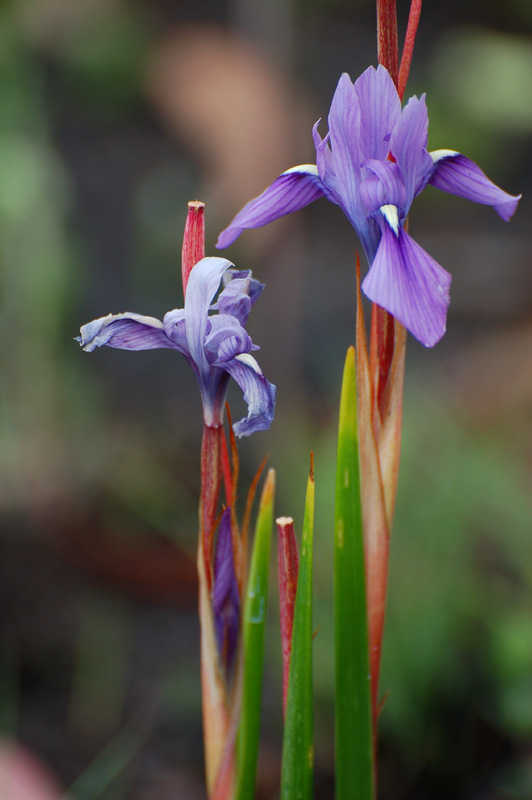
Moraea callista, a species of iris-like plant found in the Kitulo National Park

Kitulo National Park has an area of 413 square kilometres (159 sq mi) in the Kitulo Plateau – local name 'Bustani ya Mungu' meaning "The Garden of God" – located in northwest Njombe Region. The montane grassland with rich water resources is at an elevation of about 2,600 metres (8,500 ft). It is hemmed between the rugged peaks of the Kipengere, Poroto, and Livingstone Mountains and has volcanic soils, and is drained by the Ruaha River. In view of its rich floral abundance, the park is a gazetted area. Wild animals are few and mostly mountain reedbuck and eland. Bird life is also very widely watched by ornithologists and consists mainly of Denham’s bustard, endangered blue swallow, mountain marsh widow, Njombe cisticola and Kipengere seedeater. Other endemic species of wild life consist of butterflies, chameleons, lizards and frogs. The park’s headquarters is located at Matamba inside the park, which is 100 kilometres (62 mi) from Mbeya town.

=== Mahale Mountains National Park ===
Mahale Mountains National Park, next to the Gombe Stream National Park is set on the shores of the Lake Tanganyika in Uvinza District of Kigoma Region, with a watershed comprising richly forested Mahale Mountains with its peaks as high as 2 kilometres (1.2 mi) above the lake shore. Nkungwe peak (2,460 metres (8,070 ft)) is the park’s largest mountain in the Mahale range which is venerated by the local Tongwe people. Located in a remote and not easily approachable area, the park is spread over an area of 1,613 square kilometres (623 sq mi). Among the wild animals found here, chimpanzees are a star attraction with a reported population of about 800. Other primates found in large numbers are the red colobus, red-tailed and blue monkey. The unpolluted clear water lake, the second deepest lake in Tanzania, has as many as 1,000 fish species.

=== Lake Manyara National Park ===
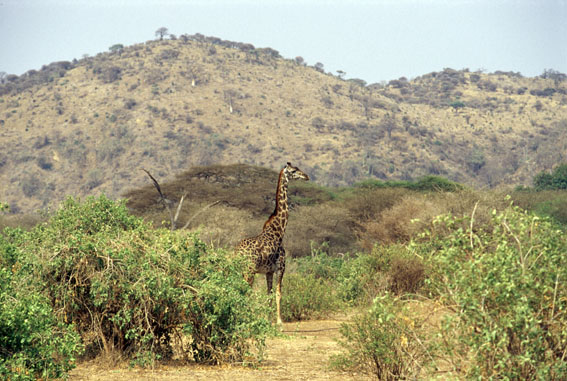
A giraffe in the Lake Manyara National Park

Lake Manyara National Park, which encompasses an area of 330 square kilometres (130 sq mi) includes 200 square kilometres (77 sq mi) (at high water stage) of Lake Manyara, an alkaline lake, below the 600 metres (2,000 ft) high rift valley; Ernest Hemingway called this lake “the loveliest I had seen in Africa” is located in both in Arusha Region and Manyara Region. The geography of the park is seen formed by the serrated blue volcanic peaks that rise from the extensive Maasai steppes. It lies within the riverine and palustrine wetland ecosystem. Wild animals seen are troops of baboons, blue monkeys, bushbuck, giraffes, tree climbing lions, squadrons of banded mongoose, Kirk's dik-dik and pairs of klipspringer. Elephants, which were nearing extinction in the 1980s due to poaching, have been well conserved now. Bird life of 400 species are recorded in the park and on any given day at least 100 of them could be sighted – large number of pink-hued flamingoes, water birds such as pelicans, cormorants and storks. The entry gate to the park is 126 kilometres (78 mi), west of Arusha from Mto wa Mbu, an ethnic town. The park is also connected by charter or scheduled flights from Arusha via Serengeti and Ngorongoro Crater. Recent activities in the park relate to "canoeing, mountain biking, walking and abseiling" It is located between Lake Victoria and the Arusha-Dodoma Road.

=== Mikumi National Park ===
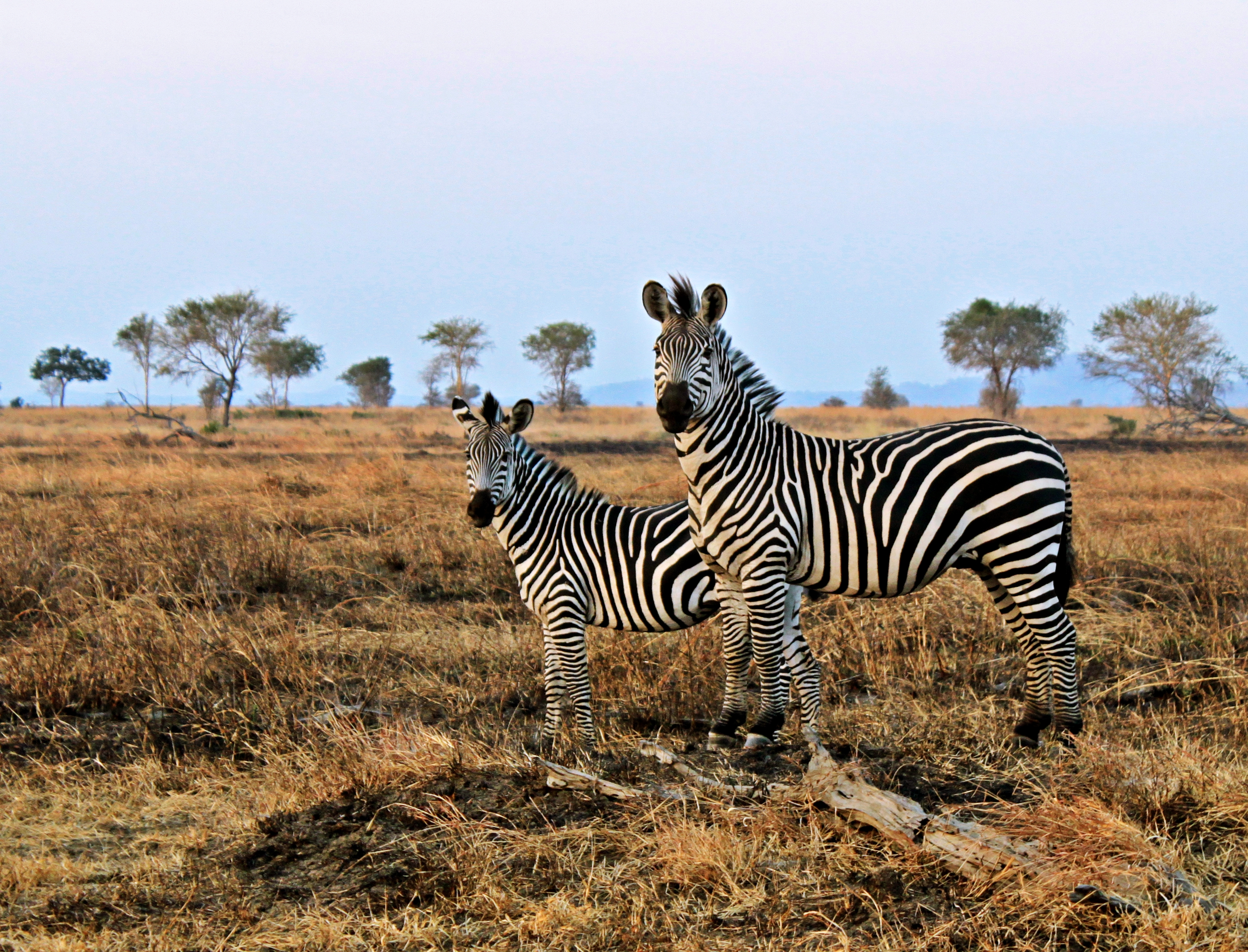
A pair of zebras in the Mikumi National Park

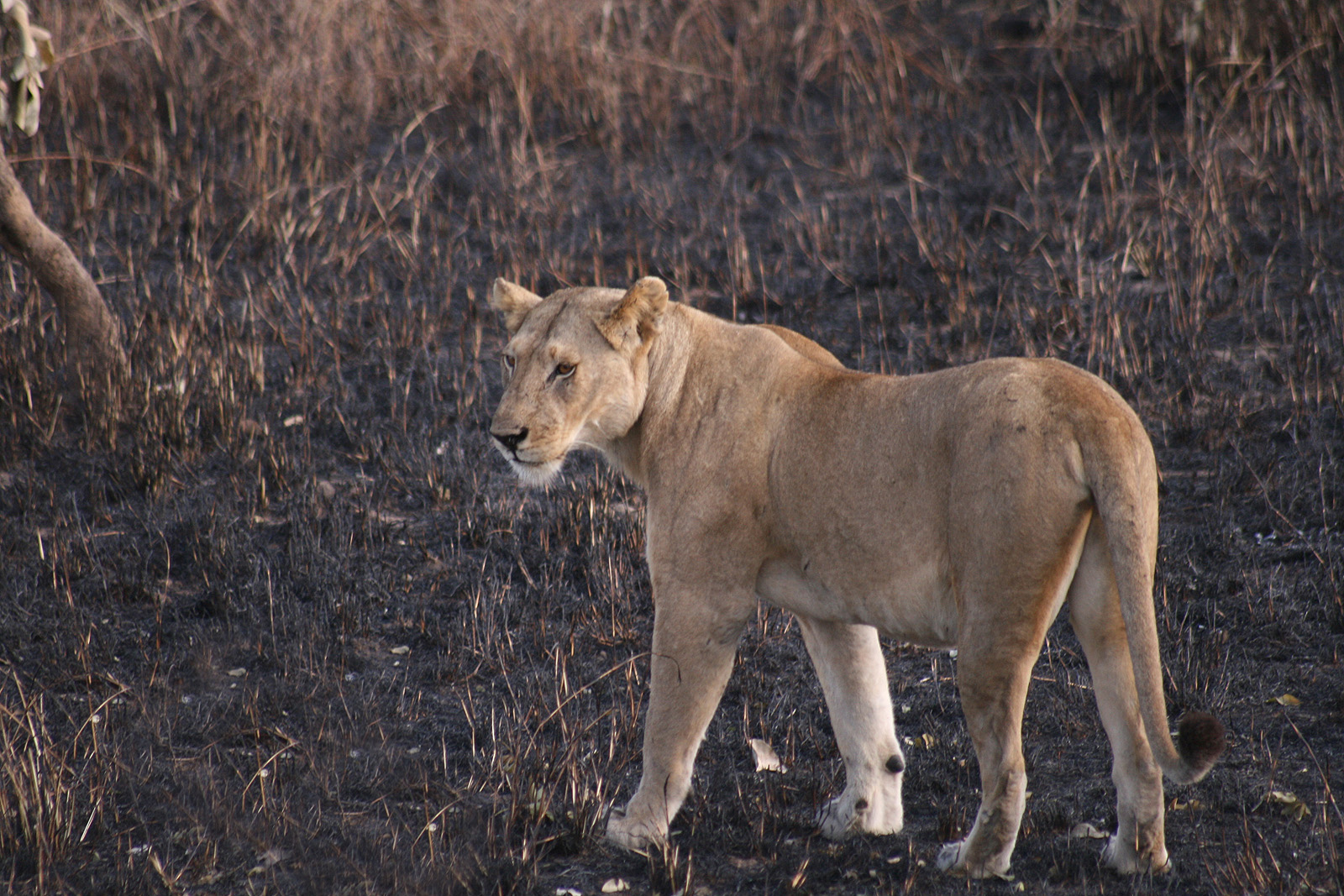
A lioness in the Mikumi National Park

Mikumi National Park covers an area of 3,230 square kilometres (1,250 sq mi) (the fourth largest park in the country) in a 75,000 square kilometres (29,000 sq mi) tract of wilderness in Morogoro Region. It borders in the north with the Selous Game Reserve, which is the largest such reserve in Africa. The habitat has the Mkata floodplain, extensive grass plains with the Mkata River flowing through the park and the miombo-covered foothills of the mountains. It lies within the riverine and palustrine wetland ecosystem. Animal life consists of herd of zebras, lions in the grassy vastness, wildebeest, impala, buffalo herds, giraffes, elands, kudu, sable and hippos in water ponds (5 kilometres (3.1 mi) north of the main entrance gate). Antelope, and elephants are also seen. Bird species recorded are 400, which includes lilac-breasted roller, yellow-throated longclaw and bateleur eagle. It is connected by a 283 kilometres (176 mi) road with Dar es Salaam, via Selous Reserve, Ruaha, Udzungwa and Katavi.

=== Ruaha National Park ===
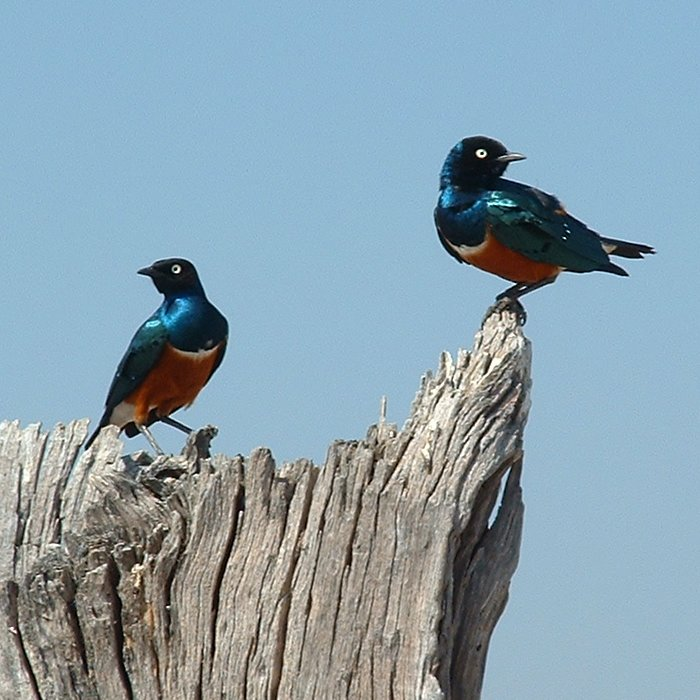
Superb starlings (Lamprotornis superbus) observed in the Ruaha National Park

Ruaha National Park is Tanzania's largest national park, covering 20,226 square kilometres (7,809 sq mi). It has rugged, semi-arid bush country, typical of central Tanzania located in Iringa Region. The Ruaha River flows through the park and gets flooded during the rainy season, otherwise remaining an ephemeral stream with ponds, sand and rocky river bed and banks. The park includes an extensive riverine and palustrine wetland ecosystem on the Usangu Plain. Open grasslands and acacia savanna abound in the park. There are reportedly 10,000 elephants, zebras, giraffes, impala, waterbuck and other antelopes, cheetahs, striped and spotted hyena, sable and roan antelope sable and roan antelope, greater kudu with corkscrew horns (which is the park’s emblem) in the park. Of the reported 450 bird species, notable ones are the crested barbet (yellow-and-black bird), endemics such as the yellow-collared lovebird and ashy starling. It is located 128 km west of Iringa. (p 20-21)

=== Rubondo Island National Park ===
Rubondo Island National Park is an island park with an area of 457 square kilometres (176 sq mi). It is located in Geita Region, 150 kilometres (93 mi) west of Mwanza. It includes nine smaller islands. It is in the lacustrine wetland ecosystem on the shores of the Lake Victoria. Known as a "water wonderland", it is fish breeding ground; tilapia, spotted-necked otters and Nile perch (as heavy as 100 kilograms (220 lb)) are some of the special species.

Mammal species abound in this remote and not easily accessible park and consist of indigenous species of hippos, vervet monkeys, genets and mongooses, which coexist with introduced species of chimpanzee, black-and-white colobus, elephant and giraffe, bushbucks, shaggy-coated aquatic sitatunga. Fish eagles are seen near the bay and so also crocodiles.

=== Saadani National Park ===
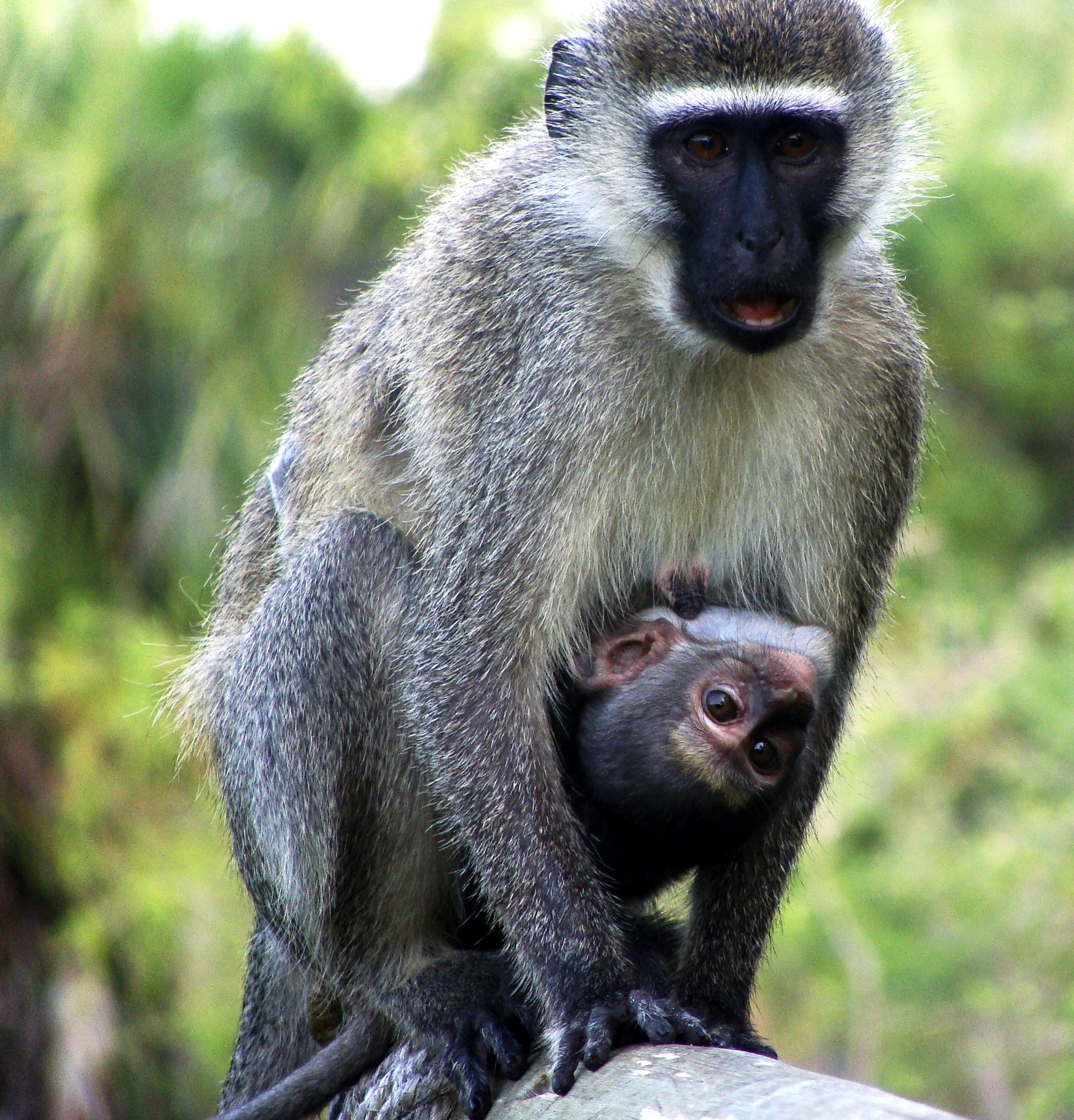
A baby vervet monkey clings to its mother at Saadani National Park.

Saadani National Park, a game reserve since the 1960s, was declared a national park in 2002, covers an area of 1,062 square kilometres (410 sq mi) including the former Mkwaja ranch area, the Wami River and the Zaraninge forest. It is the only park in East Africa with an Indian Ocean beachfront. It is located and shared between Pangani Districtof Tanga Region and Chalinze District of Pwani Region. It is Tanzania's 13th National Park. Animals are seen basking along the Indian Ocean shores. Before it was declared a national park it was maintained by the World Wide Fund for Nature (WWF) with the objective to preserve the last coastal rainforest in the country. It was also run as a cattle ranch between 1952 and 2000. Hunting lodges had also been established on the coastal front of the park, which catered to the celebrities who came here for hunting game and to be away from the busy life in Dare es Salam.

The climate in this sea coast fronted park is hot and humid. Marine and mainland fauna reported in the park are of 30 species of large mammals, reptiles and birds; elephants, black and white colobus monkeys and Roosevelt sable antelope are some of the terrestrial species, while the marine or coastal species noted are many species of fish, green turtles which breed on the beaches, dolphins (pomboo) and humpback whales (nyangumi).

=== Serengeti National Park ===
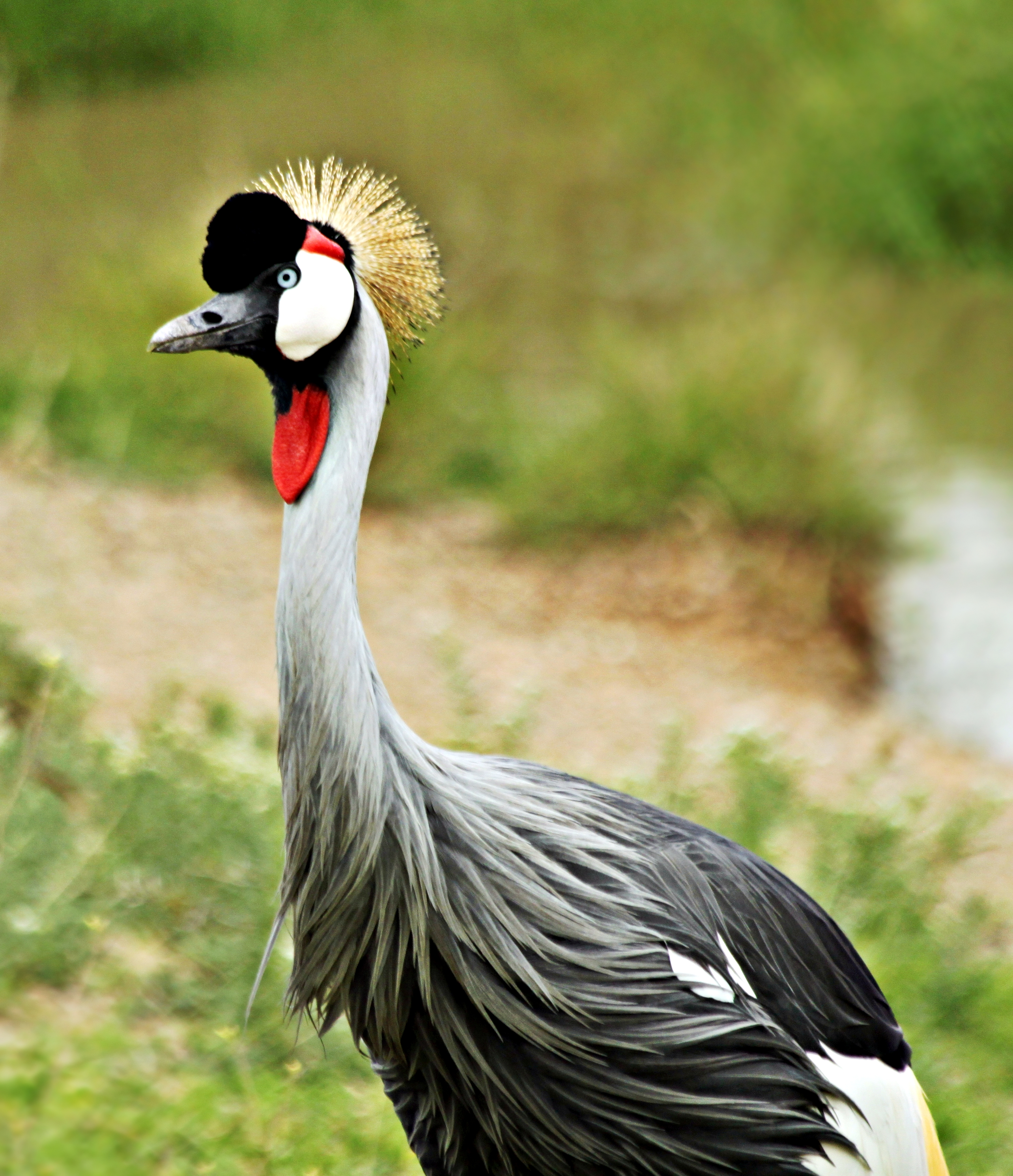
Grey crowned crane in Serengeti National Park

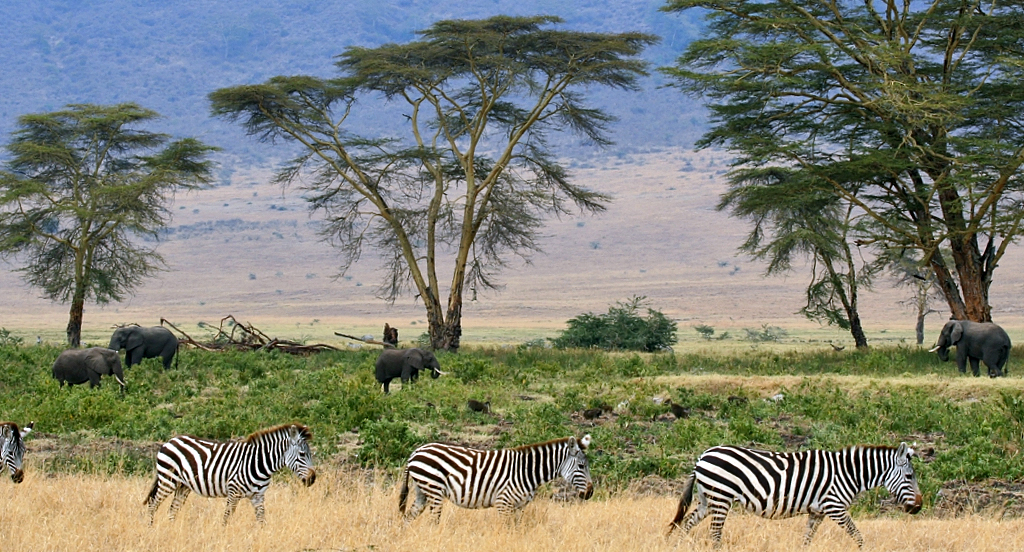
Zebras in the Serengeti savanna plains

Serengeti National Park is the oldest and most popular national park which was established in 1951, with an area of 14,763 square kilometres (5,700 sq mi) located entirely in Mara Region. The habitat, bounded by Kenya and bordered by Lake Victoria on the west, is characterized by vast plains, savannah, wooded hills, large termite mounds, rivers, and acacia woodlands. The spectacular wildlife witnessed in the park generally refers to the great wildebeest migration where a million wildebeests chase green lands across the rolling plains of Serengeti in Tanzania and Masai Mara in Kenya. Sometimes they are seen in 40 square kilometres (15 sq mi) long columns migrating across the rivers to the north, over a distance of 1,000 square kilometres (390 sq mi), after spending three weeks of mating and giving birth to 8000 calves daily. This migration and life cycle creation is an annual feature witnessed in the park. This migration is in unison with 200,000 zebra and 300,000 Thomson's gazelle in search of grazing pastures, aptly described as "six million hooves pound the open plains". Other mammals seen here are buffaloes, elephants, giraffe, large number of elands, topis, kongonis, impalas, and Grant's gazelles. The predators inhabiting the park are lions, leopards, jackals, spotted hyenas, rock hyrax and serval cats. Reptiles include agama lizards and crocodiles. Bird species recorded are more than 500, which include ostrich and secretary bird. 100 varieties of dung beetle are also reported.

=== Tarangire National Park ===
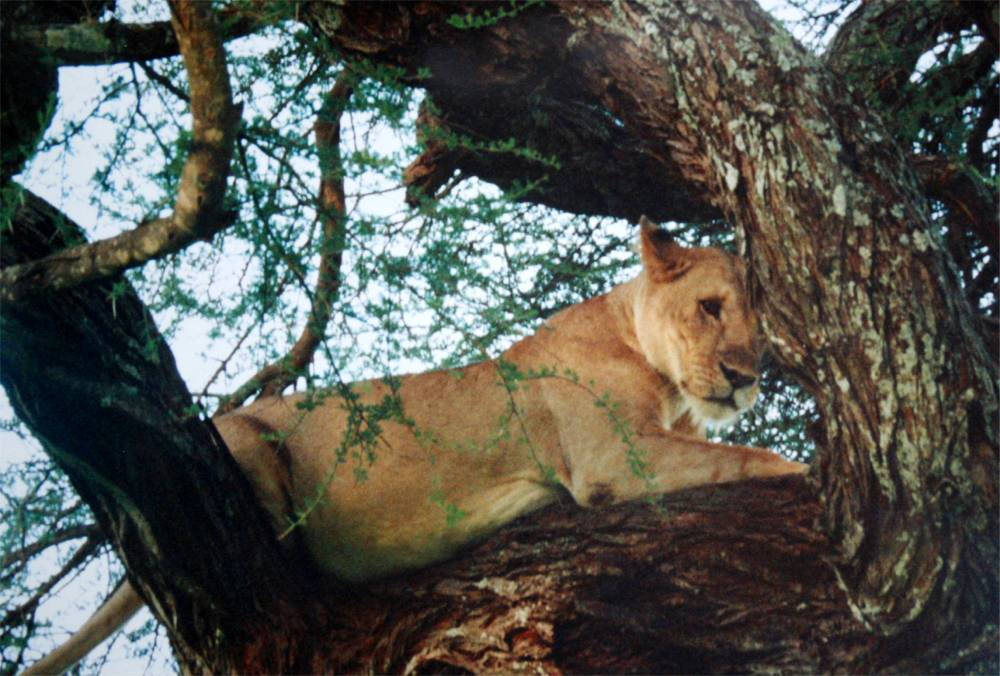
Tree-climbing lion (Panthera leo) in Tarangire National Park

Tarangire National Park is the sixth largest national park in Tanzania named after the Tarangire River which flows through the park and is a perennial river that assures water to both humans and animals even during the dry period. The park is located within Manyara Region and It has an area of 2,850 square kilometres (1,100 sq mi) to the south east of Lake Manyara. Mammals in the park are a number of elephants and migratory wildebeest, zebra, buffalo, impala, gazelle, hartebeest and eland. Predators seen are the tree climbing lions and leopards. The most common reptile seen is African pythons climbing the baobab trees. The park has 550 breeding species of birds stated to be the largest number in any park in the world; Kori bustard (heaviest flying bird), the stocking-thighed ostrich (world's largest bird), ground hornbills, yellow-collared lovebird, rufous-tailed weaver and ashy starling which are endemic to savanna habitat are seen in the park. Termite mounds, dwarf mongoose and pairs of red-and-yellow barbets are a common sight in the park. It is accessed by road from the southwest of Arusha over a distance of 18 kilometres (11 mi). Airlinks are also available from airports at Arusha and the Serengeti.

=== Udzungwa Mountains National Park ===
Udzungwa Mountains National Park, with an area of 1,990 square kilometres (770 sq mi), is part of the Eastern Arc Mountains (which comprise mountain ranges from the Taita Hills in southern Kenya to the Makambako Gap in south-central Tanzania). Sometimes called an "African Galapagos" for the uniqueness of its wildlife, the park encompasses hills ranging in elevation between 250 metres (820 ft) and the 2,576 metres (8,451 ft) of Lohomero peak, the highest in the park. The park shares border with eastern Njombe Region and Kilombero District. The park's habitat covers tropical rainforest, mountain forest, miombo woodland, grassland and steppe. The park has the distinction of holding 30–40 percent of plants and animal species of Tanzania. More than 400 bird species and 6 primate species are reported from the park. It has the second largest biodiversity of a national park within Africa. It is included in the list of 34 "World Biodiversity Hotspots". It is also listed as one of the 200 WWF Eco regions of global critical importance. Six primate species have been recorded, five of which are endemic. The Udzungwa red colobus and Sanje mangabey are only found in the Udzungwa Mountains National Park; that mangabey was only recognised as a distinct species in 1986.

== Ngorongoro Conservation Area ==
Although it is not a national park, the Ngorongoro Conservation Area (NCA) with an area of 8,292 square kilometres (3,202 sq mi) In Arusha Region was recognized by the United Nations Educational, Scientific and Cultural Organization as a World Heritage Site in 1979. The criteria cited for this recognition include: (1) crucial evidence found within the NCA about human evolution and human-environment dynamics (this criterion added in 2010); (2) the "stunning landscape" of Ngorongoro Crater, the largest unbroken caldera in the world; (3) the NCA's large concentration of wildlife, including 25,000 large animals; and (4) the NCA's variations in climate, landforms and altitude, resulting in several overlapping ecosystems and distinct habitats.

== Fauna ==
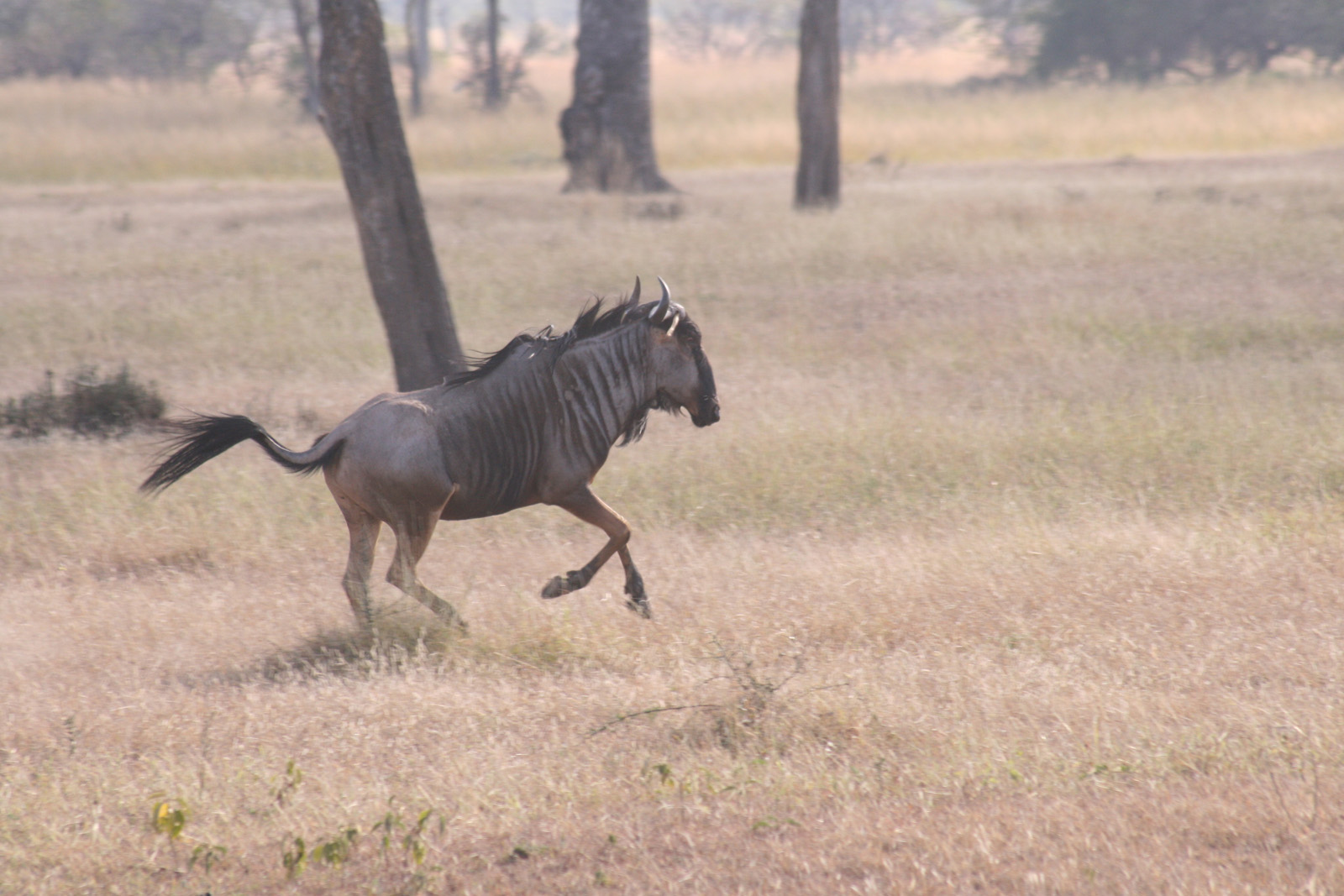
Wildebeest in Mikumi National Park

The faunal diversity of wild life in Tanzania in its national parks and game reserves is also dramatic. There are 310 mammal species (fourth largest in Africa); 960 species of birds (third place in Africa); and many amphibians and reptiles, which are stated to form the fourth largest population in Africa. The endangered fauna species are; the black rhino; Uluguru bushshrikes; hawksbill, green turtles, olive ridley turtle and leatherback turtles; red colobus monkeys; wild dogs; and Pemba flying foxes. However, Lonely Planet also mentions a figure of 430 species of four million animals, and 60,000 insect species, 100 species of snakes and 25 species of reptiles, 1000 species of birds. More details of fauna species as reported by the Museum of Zoology of the University of Michigan, Bucknell University, Avibase data profiles and BirdLife International data profiles are the following. In the East Usambara Mountains, the forests display many rare species, so much so that the fauna found here have been compared to the Galapagos Islands in terms of biological importance.

Mammals

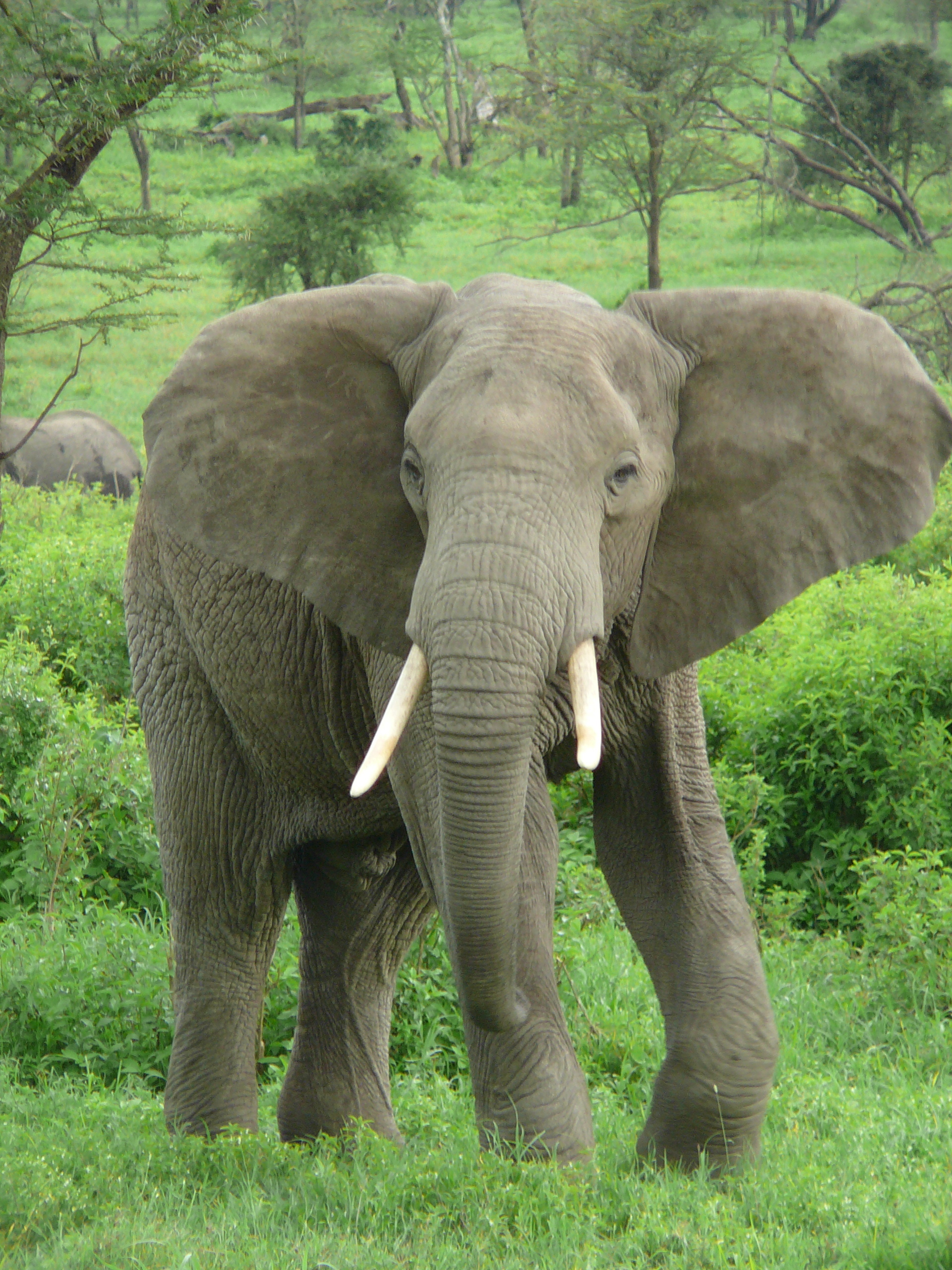
African bush elephant (Loxodonta africana) in Tanzania

Three hundred species of mammals have been reported in Tanzania. Some of the species reported are African bush elephant (Loxodonta africana), Burchell's zebra (Equus burchellii), Thomson's gazelle (Eudorcas thomsonii), hartebeest (Alcelaphus buselaphus), woodland dormouse (Graphiurus murinus), kipunji (Rungwecebus kipunji), Thomas's bushbaby (Galago thomasi), Prince Demidoff's bushbaby (Galagoides demidovii), puku (Kobus vardonii), gerenuk (Litocranius walleri), common warthog (Phacochoerus africanus), pygmy scaly-tailed flying squirrel (Idiurus zenkeri), suni (Neotragus moschatus), mbarapi (Hippotragus niger) and North African crested porcupine (Hystrix cristata).

Predators

A few predators species are: lion (Panthera leo), spotted hyena (Crocuta crocuta), black-backed jackal (Canis mesomelas) and serval (Leptailurus serval).

Primates

Some of the primate species reported are: chimpanzee (Pan troglodytes), and baboons (Papio): anubis baboon (Papio anubis), yellow baboon (Papio cynocephalus), and hamadryas baboon (Papio hamadryas).

Birds

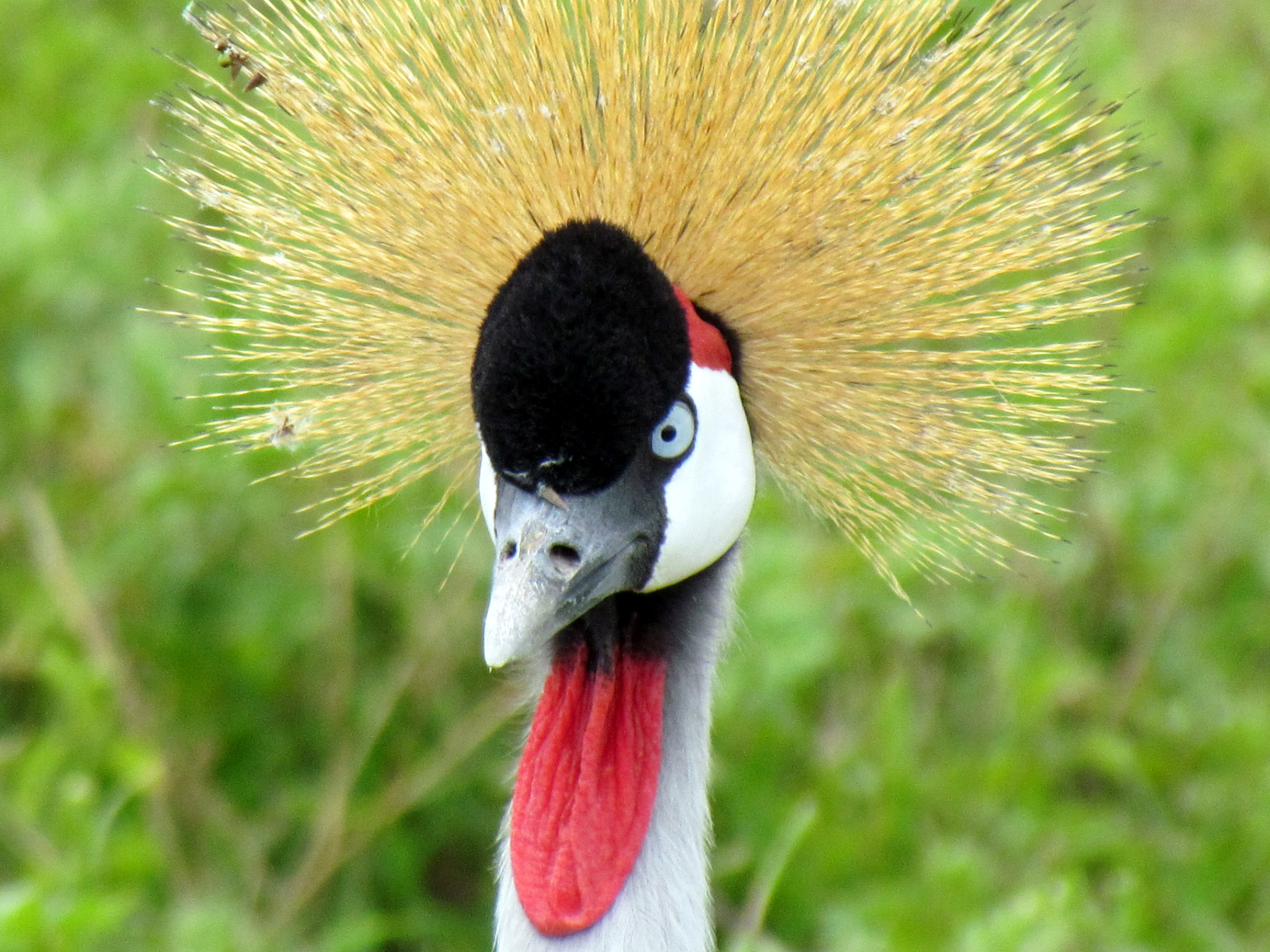
Grey crowned crane (Balearica regulorum), a vulnerable species found in wetland-grassland habitats in Tanzania

As of March 2004, according to the Avibase database, the number of bird species in Tanzania was reported as 1112 species (according to BirdLife International it is 1128), 23 endemic species, 35 globally threatened species and 3 introduced species. The conservation status of grey crowned cranes found in wetland-grassland habitats of eastern and southern Africa including Tanzania is listed as vulnerable.

Endemic species

Endemic species are: yellow-collared lovebird (Agapornis personatus), Pemba green pigeon (Treron pembaensis), Pemba scops owl (Otus pembaensis), Usambara eagle-owl (Bubo vosseleri), Beesley's lark (Chersomanes beesleyi), Mrs. Moreau's warbler (Scepomycter winifredae), Usambara hyliota (Hyliota usambarae), Usambara akalat (Sheppardia montana), Iringa akalat (Sheppardia lowei), Rubeho akalat (Sheppardia aurantiithorax), banded sunbird (Anthreptes rubritorques), Moreau's sunbird (Nectarinia moreaui), rufous-winged sunbird (Nectarinia rufipennis), Tanzania seedeater (Serinus melanochrous), rufous-tailed weaver (Histurgops ruficauda), Kilombero weaver (Ploceus burnieri), Tanganyika masked weaver (Ploceus reichardi) and Usambara weaver (Ploceus nicolli).

Introduced species

Introduced species are: rock pigeon (Columba livia) and house crow (Corvus splendens).

== Conservation ==
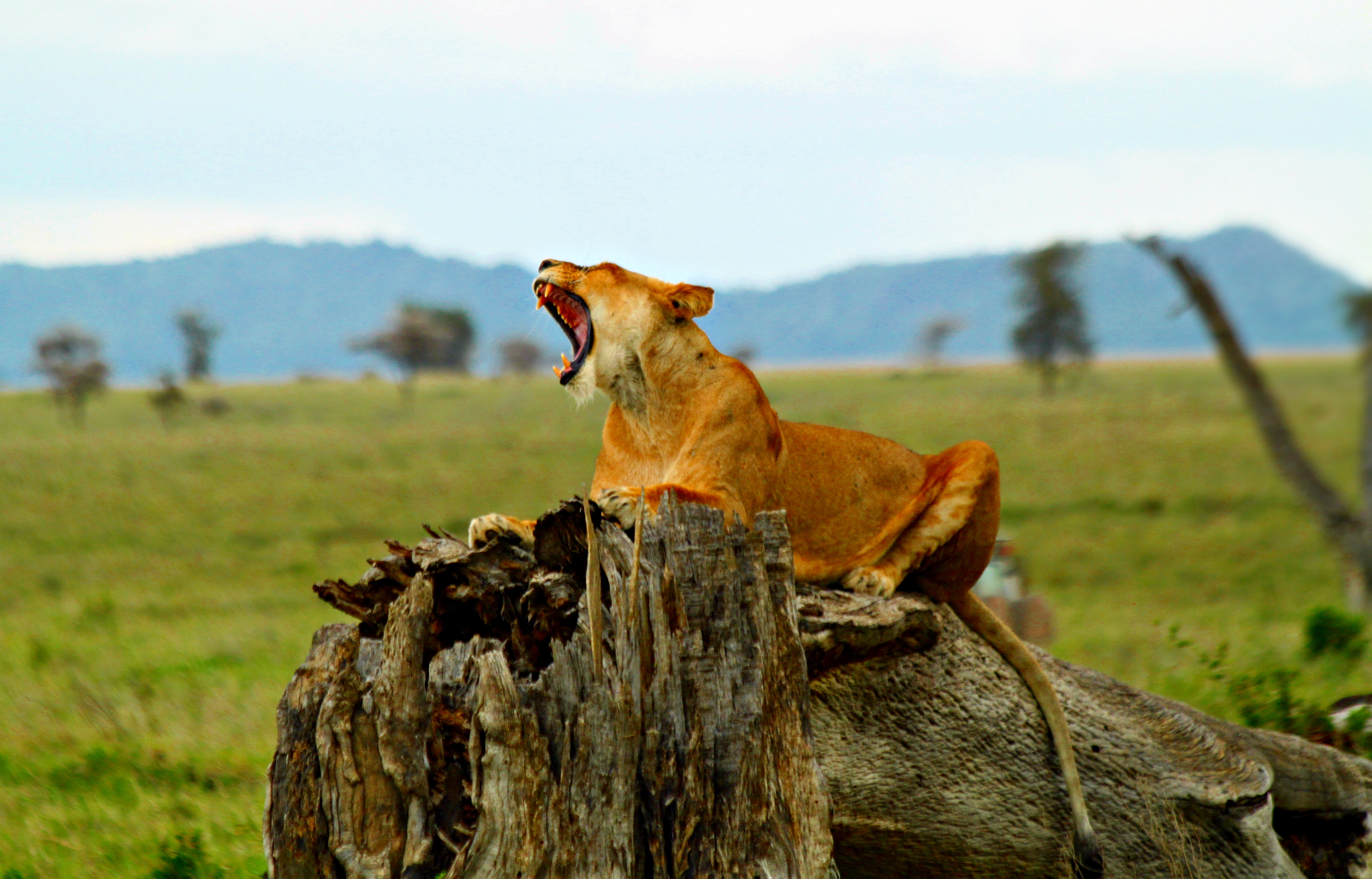
A lioness roars in the Ngorongoro Conservation Area, Tanzania.

Poaching and anthropological pressure to meet the huge demand of wildlife meat has been a major problem in Tanzania with reported removal of 160,000 to 200,000 animals annually in the 1990s. The Government of Tanzania, in collaboration with international aid agencies, has made serious efforts to contain this problem through wildlife law enactment and enforcement and finding solutions to the conflict between wildlife conservation and the needs of rural communities dependent on these resources. Anti-poaching operations have been conducted on several occasions and game-viewing tourism has been a success in the easily accessible northern wildlife area of the country. Trophy hunting has also provided some respite to the problem and this has helped in generating revenue, generally in the northern, southern and western wildlife areas.

A February 2020 report on wildlife censuses carried out in October 2018 and November 2018 in the Selous-Mikumi ecosystem indicates that populations of elephants, hippopotamuses, and zebras have increased and that poaching has been brought under control.

== See also ==
- Wildlife of Zanzibar
