= Rungwe dwarf galago =

Scientific classification
- Domain: Eukaryota
- Kingdom: Animalia
- Phylum: Chordata
- Class: Mammalia
- Order: Primates
- Suborder: Strepsirrhini
- Family: Galagidae
- Genus: Paragalago
- Species: P. sp.

Binomial name
- Paragalago sp.

Species of primate

The Rungwe dwarf galago is a newly identified species of eastern dwarf galago. Specimens were first collected in the 1930s, but were identified as different species. A formal description of the species is presently being made.

== Description ==
The Rungwe dwarf galago has dark-brown fur, with tan hands and feet and a very bushy black-tipped tail.

== Distribution and habitat ==
The Rungwe dwarf galago inhabits montane evergreen forests and bamboo forests. Specimens have been identified from several adjacent locations in Tanzania's Southern Highlands – Mount Rungwe, the Poroto Mountains, the Livingstone Forest of Kitulo National Park in the Kipengere Range, and Madehani Forest Reserve in the Kipengere Range in Rungwe District of Mbeya Region. They are locally common in these forests, which cover an area of less than 300 km^{2}. Its range doesn't overlap with any other galago species.
