= Southern Highlands, Tanzania =

Region of Tanzania

Coordinates: 9.1667°S 34.5167°E

The Southern Highlands is a highland region in southwestern Tanzania, at the northern end of Lake Malawi. The highlands include portions of Mbeya, Iringa, Njombe, Rukwa, Ruvuma, and Songwe regions, bordering Malawi, Mozambique, and Zambia. Mbeya is the largest city in the highlands.

== Geography ==
The highlands comprise a group of plateaus and volcanic mountains, including the Mbeya Mountains, Poroto Mountains, Kipengere Range, Mount Rungwe, Kitulo Plateau, Umalila Mountains, and Matengo Highlands. The Ufipa Plateau extends northwest, between Lake Tanganyika and Lake Rukwa. The eastern and western branches of the East African Rift converge in the highlands, and the Western Rift continues south as the valley of Lake Malawi. To the northeast, the Makambako Gap separates the Southern Highlands from the Eastern Arc Mountains.

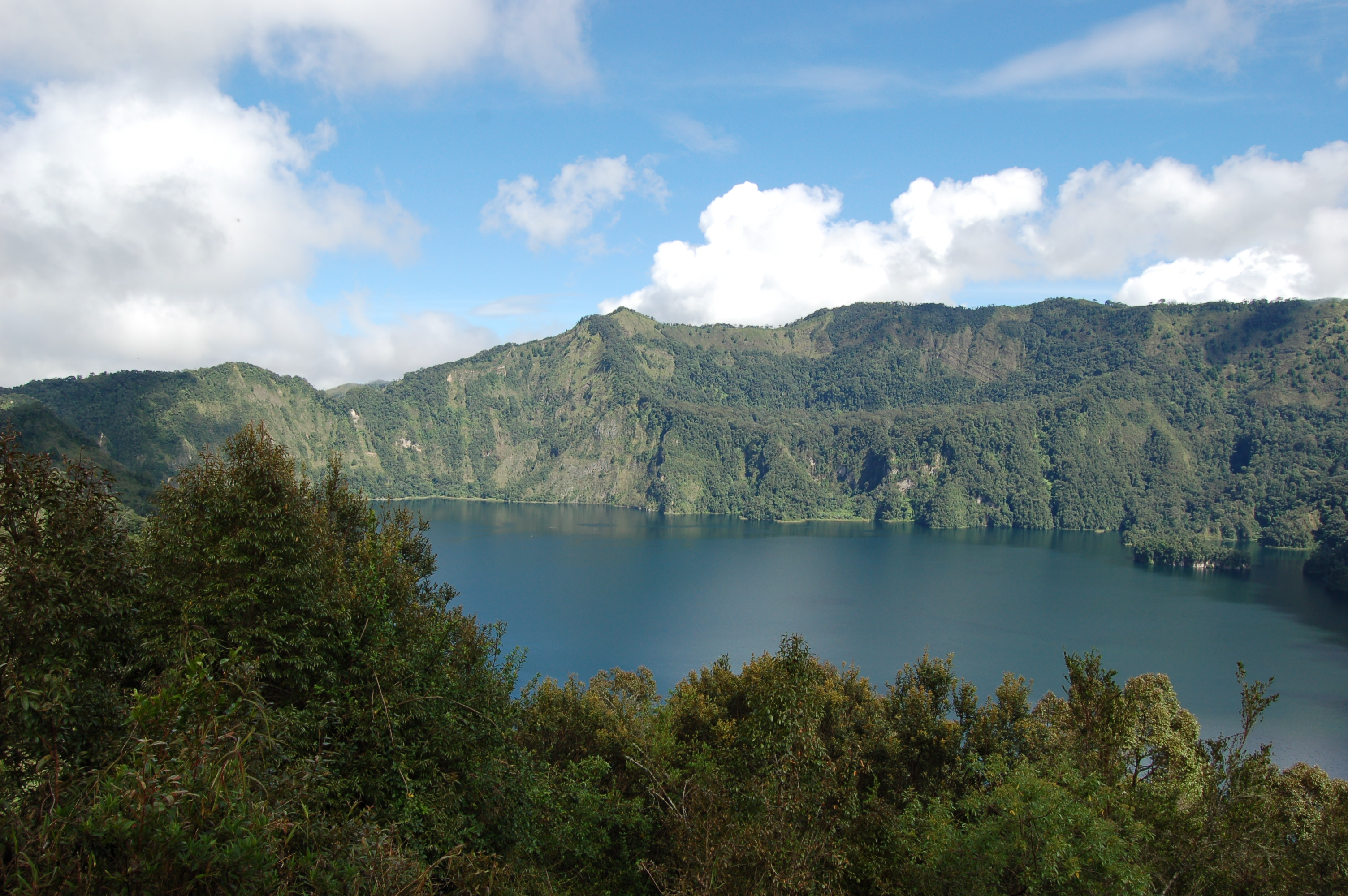
Lake Ngozi in the Poroto Mountains.

Mt. Rungwe (2,960 metres), and Mtorwe (2961 m) in the Kipengere Range, are the highest peaks in the highlands. Other peaks include Chaluhangi (2933 m) and Ishinga (2688 m) in the Kipengere Range, Ngozi (2621 m) in the Poroto Mountains, and Mbeya (2826 m), Loloza (2656 m), and Pungulomo (2273 m) in the Mbeya Mountains.

The northern and eastern slopes of the Mbeya Mountains and the eastern portion of the Ufipa Plateau drain into the closed basin of Lake Rukwa. The Great Ruaha River, a tributary of the Rufiji River, drains the eastern slopes of the Mbeya and Kipengere mountains.

Rivers flowing into Lake Malawi drain the southern portion of the highlands. The Songwe River drains the western and southern Umalila Mountains, and forms the boundary between Tanzania and Malawi. The Kiwira River drains the east slope of the Umalila Mountains, south slope of the Poroto Mountains, and western slope of Mount Rungwe. The Lufilyo River drains the east slope of Mount Rungwe and the Livingstone Forest in Kitulo National Park. A number of smaller streams descend the steep western escarpment of the Kipengere Range and western Matengo Highlands. The Ruhuhu River drains the southern portion of the Kipengere Range and northern Matengo Highlands.

The eastern slopes of the Matengo Highlands drain into the Ruvuma River.

== Climate ==
Rainfall ranges from 823 mm on the Ufipa Plateau up to 2,850 mm on the slopes of Mount Rungwe and the Livingstone and Poroto mountains facing Lake Malawi. Rainfall is mostly during the November through April wet season, although higher elevations experience mists and light rain during the May through August dry season. Rainfall comes from convective thunderstorms that form over Lake Malawi, and the slopes facing towards lake are generally wetter. The highlands are cooler than the surrounding lowlands, with annual temperatures between 13 °C and 19 °C. The highest elevations experience regular nighttime frosts between June and August.

== Ecology ==
The Southern Highlands are covered with grasslands, savannas, woodlands, and forests. Miombo woodland and savanna predominates at lower elevations. At higher elevations the mountains are home to Afromontane evergreen forests, grasslands, and shrublands, part of the Southern Rift montane forest-grassland mosaic ecoregion, which extends into the nearby mountains of Malawi and Zambia.

The highlands are home to several protected areas, including Kitulo National Park, Mpanga-Kipengere Game Reserve, Mount Rungwe Nature Forest Reserve, and forest reserves.

== Transport ==
Tanzania's A104 highway connects Mbeya with Tanzania's capital Dodoma and continues west from Mbeya to Tunduma on the Zambian border. The TAZARA Railway parallels the A104 through the highlands.

== Bibliography ==
- Latham, P. (2008) Plants visited by bees and other useful plants of Umalila, southern Tanzania DFID. ISBN 978-0955420832
