= Ngozi Geothermal Power Station =

Geothermal power plant in Tanzania

- Location of Ngozi Geothermal Power Station
- Country: Tanzania
- Location: Ngozi, Mbeya Region, Tanzania
- Coordinates: 08°57′54″S 33°26′01″E
- Status: Under construction
- Commission date: 2025 (Expected)
- Construction cost: US$821 million (Budgeted)
- Owner: Ngozi Geothermal Consortium

Power generation
- Nameplate capacity: 200 MW (270,000 hp)

The Ngozi Geothermal Power Station is a planned 200 MW (270,000 hp) geothermal power plant in Tanzania, which is expandable to 600 MW (800,000 hp) in future.

== Location ==
The facility is located in the Ngozi Crater, approximately 20 kilometres (12 mi), south of the city of Mbeya, where the headquarters of Mbeya Region are located. The coordinates of Ngozi Crater are: 09°00'30.0"S, 33°33'11.0"E (Latitude:-9.008333; Longitude:33.553056).

== Overview ==
Tanzania Geothermal Development Company (tGDC), a company wholly owned by the Tanzanian power utility company, Tanesco, is in the process of drilling geothermal wells in the Ngozi Crater, whose total capacity can generate up to 200 MW (270,000 hp) of electric energy. TGDC will sell the steam to a consortium comprising the Government of Tanzania, a strategic investor and one or more development partners.

The consortium will then generate electricity from the steam at this power station. The electricity will be sold to the Tanzania Electric Supply Company Limited, for integration in the Tanzania national grid. In phase I of development the power station will start with generating capacity of 200 megawatts, which will be stepped up to 600 megawatts in phase II.

== Cost and funding ==
The Tanzanian government has budgeted US$821 million for the development of this power station up to 600 megawatt capacity. During the exploration phase, US$21.73 million was spent on preliminary studies. Of that, the Climate Investment Fund loaned US$5 million and the African Development Bank granted $16.73 million.

== See also ==
- List of power stations in Tanzania
