= Mpanga-Kipengere Game Reserve =

Protected area in Tanzania

Coordinates: 8.985487°S 34.375055°E

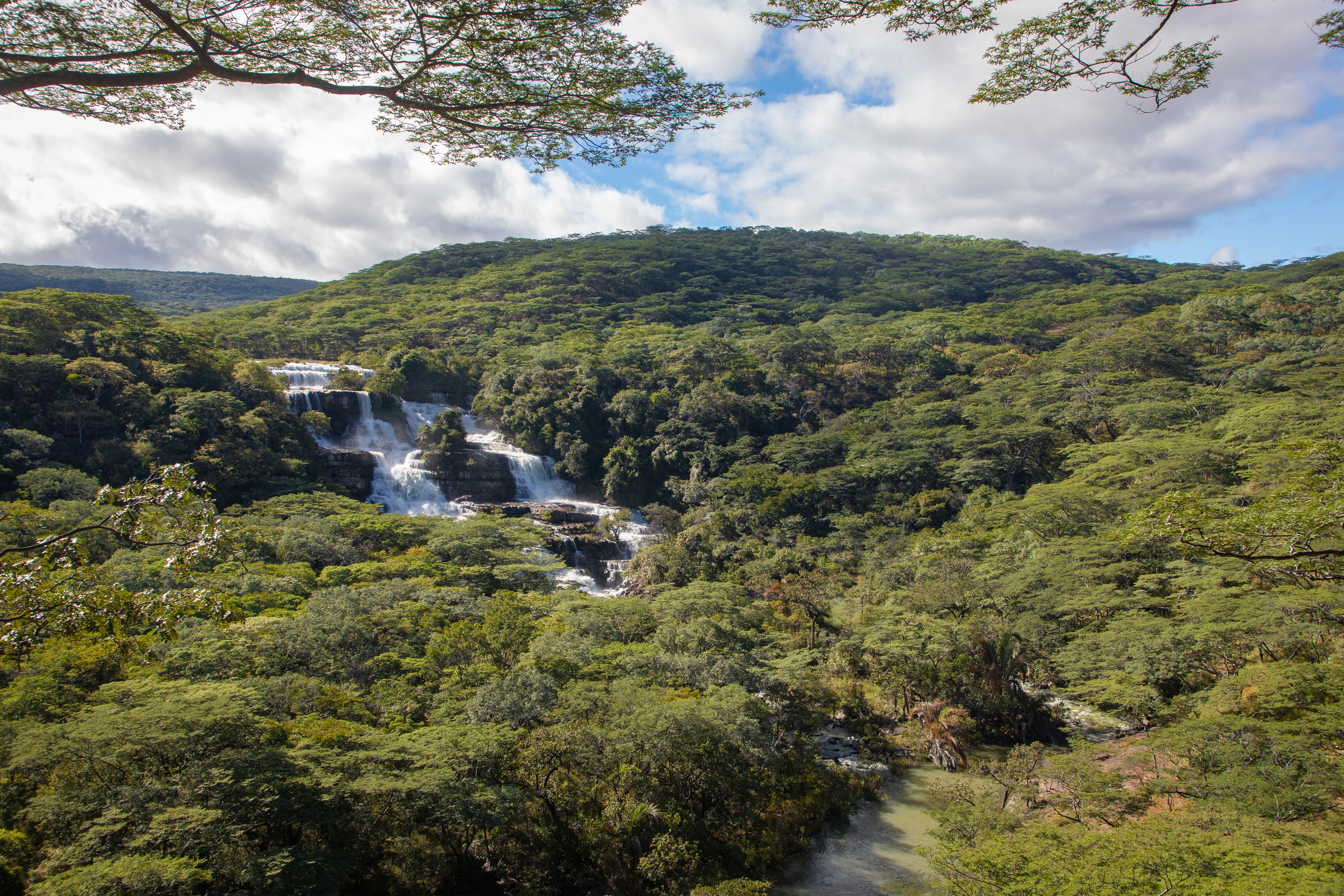
- Kimani Waterfall in the Kimani River, set in the wooded hills of the northern Kipengere Range

- Location within Tanzania
- Area: 1,574 km^{2} (608 sq mi)

Mpanga-Kipengere Game Reserve is a protected area in Njombe Region of the Southern Highlands, Tanzania. It covers an area of 1,574 km^{2} (608 sq mi) and ranges in elevation from 1,800 to 2,289 m (5,906 to 7,510 ft). In addition to the preservation of wildlife the reserve is an important catchment for the headwaters of several rivers that feed into the Great Ruaha River and provide water for the Usangu wetlands.

Since 2005, the protected area is considered a Lion Conservation Unit.

It harbours more than 17 forest types. Endemic species in Mpanga-Kipengere Game Reserve are nosed chameleon, marsh widowbird (Euplectes hartlaubi), churring cisticola (Cisticola njombe), and Kipengere seedeater (Crithagra melanochroa) and Fufumka bird.

== Geography ==
The Mpanga-Kipengere Game Reserve is located at the northern end of the Kipengere Range. It lies partly in Makete District and partly in Wanging'ombe District. Tributaries of the Great Ruaha River originating there include Mbarali, Mlomboji, Kimani and Ipera rivers, all of which flow basically northwards.
