= Trachylepis brauni =

Conservation status
- Near Threatened (IUCN 3.1)

Scientific classification
- Kingdom: Animalia
- Phylum: Chordata
- Class: Reptilia
- Order: Squamata
- Family: Scincidae
- Genus: Trachylepis
- Species: T. brauni

Binomial name
- Trachylepis brauni (Tornier, 1902)

Synonyms
- Mabuia brauni Tornier, 1902; Mabuya varia brauni — Loveridge, 1957; Mabuya brauni — Meerman, 1984; Euprepis brauni — Mausfeld et al., 2002; Trachylepis brauni — Bauer, 2003; Mabiua hildae Loveridge, 1953; Mabuya brauni hildae — Broadley, 1977; Mabuya hildae — Welch, 1982; Euprepis hildae — Mausfeld et al., 2002

Species of lizard

Trachylepis brauni, also known commonly as Braun's mabuya and the Ukinga montane skink, is a species of lizard in the family Scincidae. The species is found in Tanzania and Malawi.

== Etymology ==
The specific name, brauni, is in honor of German zoologist Rudolf H. Braun (born 1908).

== Geographic range ==
T. brauni is found in the Southern Highlands in Tanzania and in the Nyika Plateau in Malawi.

== Habitat ==
The preferred natural habitats of T. brauni are grassland and savanna, at altitudes of 2,100–2,800 m (6,900–9,200 ft).

== Reproduction ==
T. brauni is viviparous.
