= Mwatisi =

River in Tanzania

Coordinates: 9°08′S 35°59′E

Mwatisi is a river of Tanzania. It flows through the Mbeya Region.

== See also ==
- Mount Rungwe – Volcano in Mbeya Region of Tanzania
