= Kitulo National Park =

Protected area in Tanzania

- IUCN category II (national park)
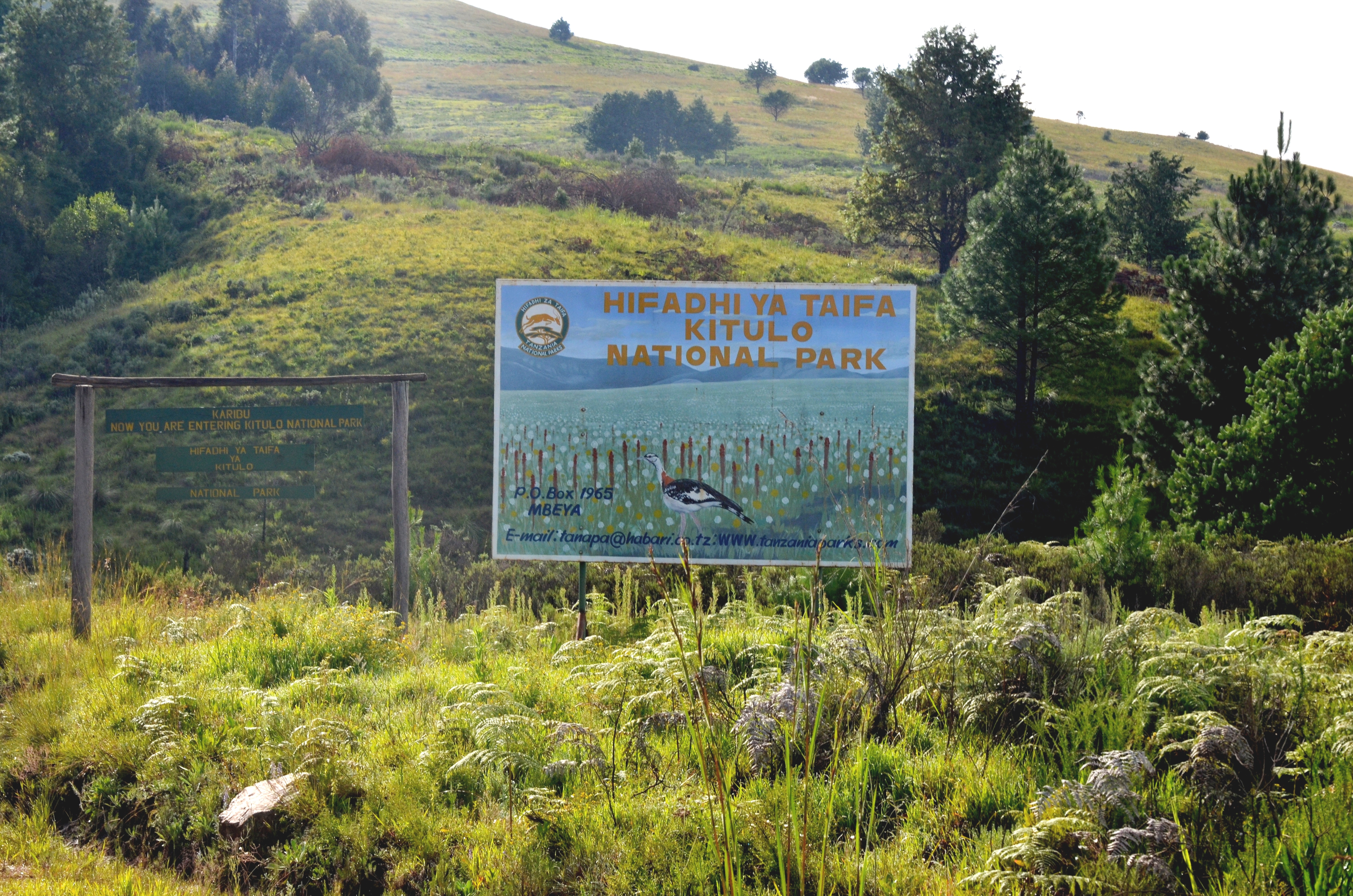

- Location within Tanzania
- Location: Njombe, Tanzania
- Nearest city: Mbeya
- Coordinates: 9°05′S 33°55′E
- Area: 413 km^{2} (159 sq mi)
- Established: 2005
- Visitors: 409 (in 2012)
- Governing body: Tanzania National Parks Authority

Kitulo National Park (Hifadhi ya Taifa ya Kitulo, in Swahili) is a national park of Tanzania, constituting a protected area of montane grassland and montane forest on the Kitulo Plateau in the southern highlands of Tanzania. The park is at an elevation of 2,600 metres (8,500 ft) between the peaks of the Kipengere and Poroto mountains and covers an area of 412.9 square kilometres (159.4 sq mi), lying in Mbeya Region and Njombe Region. The park is administered by Tanzania National Parks (TANAPA) and is the first national park in tropical Africa to be established primarily to protect its flora.

Locals refer to the Kitulo Plateau as "Bustani ya Mungu" ("The Garden of God"), while botanists have referred to it as the "Serengeti of Flowers".

== Creation of the park ==
Protection of the Kitulo Plateau's unique flora was first proposed by the Wildlife Conservation Society (WCS), in response to the growing international trade in orchid tubers and increased hunting and logging activities in the surrounding forests. In 2002, President Benjamin Mkapa announced the establishment of the park. The park was formally gazetted in 2005, becoming Tanzania's fourteenth national park. TANAPA has stated that the park could be expanded in the future to include the neighbouring Mount Rungwe forest.

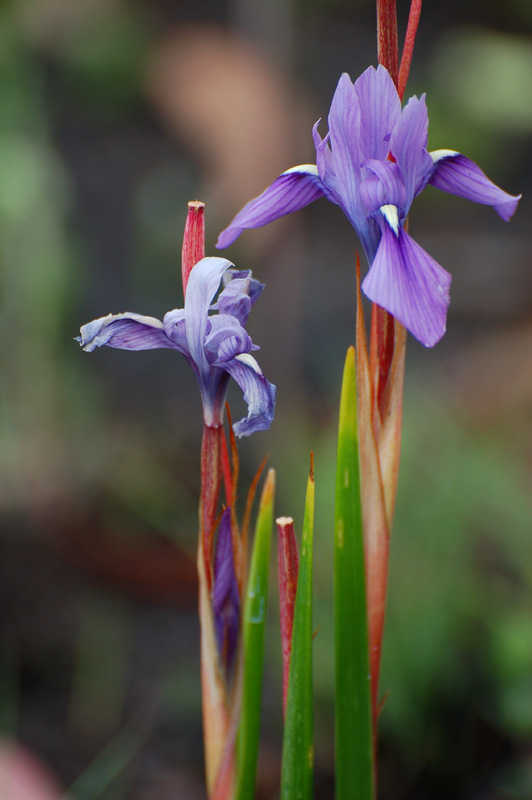
Moraea callista, a species of iris found in Kitulo National Park

== Kitulo Plateau ==
The Kitulo Plateau lies between two parallel ridges. Its montane grasslands are home to 350 species of plants, including numerous ground orchids, geophytes, and other Afroalpine plants. During the November to April wet season the montane grasslands are carpeted with displays of flowers. Many species are limited to the Kipengere Range and nearby highlands, and three – Brachystelma kituloensis, Impatiens rosulata and Pterygodium ukingense – are limited to the Kitulo Plateau.

Mammal species present in the plateau include the common duiker, side-striped jackal, slender mongoose, steenbok, and southern reedbuck. Plains zebra were hunted to extinction here in the 1960s by sheep and dairy farmers, but in October 2018, they were reintroduced from Mikumi National Park by the Wildlife Conservation Society. They have now formed multiple herds and are breeding.

== Livingstone Forest ==
The Livingstone forest is a montane evergreen forest that descends the southwestward-facing slope of the park. It is the largest block of forest in the park, and the largest in the Kipengere Range. Thickets of bamboo (Yushania alpina) can be found between the upper montane forests and the high altitude grasslands. The Livingstone Forest lies in the former Livingstone Forest Reserve (240.34 km²), which was incorporated into the national park when it was created in 2005. The Bujingijila Gap, a narrow corridor of farms and tree plantations, separates the Livingstone Forest from the Mount Rungwe forests.

The Livingstone Forest is home to three limited-range species of mammals – the endangered Kipunji (Rungwecebus kipunji), Rungwe dwarf galago (Galagoides sp. nov.), and Abbott's duiker (Cephalophus spadix). All three species also live in the forests of nearby Mount Rungwe.

In 2005, field scientists from the WCS discovered a new species of primate on and around Mount Rungwe and in the Livingstone Forest area of the park. Initially known as the Highland Mangabey, later changed to its Tanzanian name of Kipunji, it is one of the 25 most endangered primates in the world.

== Ndumbi Forest ==
The Ndumbi forest, at the eastern end of Kitulo National Park, includes montane evergreen forest and forests of East African Cedar (Juniperus procera). The former Ndumbi Valley Forest Reserve (27.71 km^{2}; 10.70 sq mi) was established in 1956, and was incorporated into the national park when it was created in 2005. The Ndumbi forest is also home to a 100 m (330 ft) waterfall.
