= Kipengere seedeater =

Conservation status
- Least Concern (IUCN 3.1)

Scientific classification
- Kingdom: Animalia
- Phylum: Chordata
- Class: Aves
- Order: Passeriformes
- Family: Fringillidae
- Subfamily: Carduelinae
- Genus: Crithagra
- Species: C. melanochroa

Binomial name
- Crithagra melanochroa (Reichenow, 1900)

Synonyms
- Serinus melanochrous

Species of bird

The Kipengere seedeater (Crithagra melanochroa), also known as the Tanzania seedeater, is a species of finch in the family Fringillidae. It is found only in Tanzania specifically in Mbeya Region and Njombe Region. Its natural habitats are subtropical or tropical moist montane forest and subtropical or tropical high-elevation shrubland. It is threatened by habitat loss.

The Kipengere seedeater was formerly placed in the genus Serinus but phylogenetic analysis using mitochondrial and nuclear DNA sequences found that the genus was polyphyletic. The genus was therefore split and a number of species including the Kipengere seedeater were moved to the resurrected genus Crithagra.

== Range ==
The Kipengere seedeater is found in montane forest and shrubland in the Udzungwa Mountains, Kipengere Range, and Mount Rungwe.
