= Matema =

Ward in Mbeya, Tanzania

Matema Kata ya Matema
- Ward
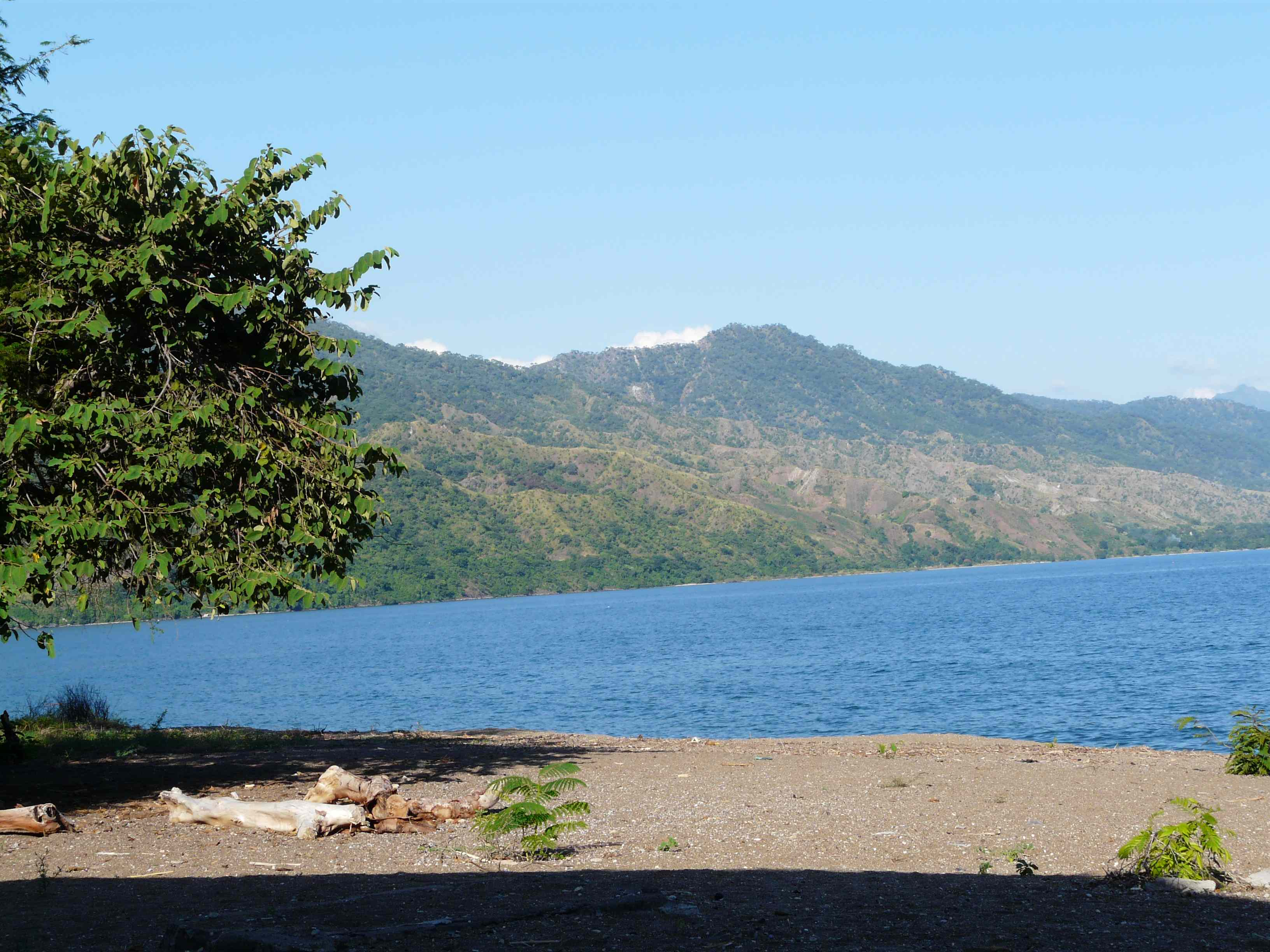
- Matema beach

- Location within Tanzania Location within Africa
- Coordinates: 9°29′30″S 34°02′0″E
- Country: Tanzania
- Region: Mbeya Region
- District: Mbeya Urban
- Ward: Matema

Population (2016)
  - Total: 10,304
- Time zone: UTC+3 (EAT)
- Postcode: 53715

Matema is a town in southwestern Tanzania. The town is primarily a fishing village with some agriculture. It is located on the northern tip of Lake Nyasa and is 90 kilometres (straight-line distance) south-east of Mbeya.In 2016 the Tanzania National Bureau of Statistics report there were 10,304 people in the ward, from 17,103 in 2012.

== Villages / vitongoji ==
The ward has 3 villages and 12 vitongoji.

- Ikombe
  - Busisya
  - Ikunda
  - Isimba
  - Lyulilo
  - Njisi
- Kisyosyo
  - Busona
  - Kisyosyo
  - Lusonjo
- Matema
  - Bulinda
  - Ibungu
  - Itukisyo
  - Matema
