= Kitulo Plateau =

Area of National Park in Tanzania

Coordinates: 9.0903575°S 33.9278906°E

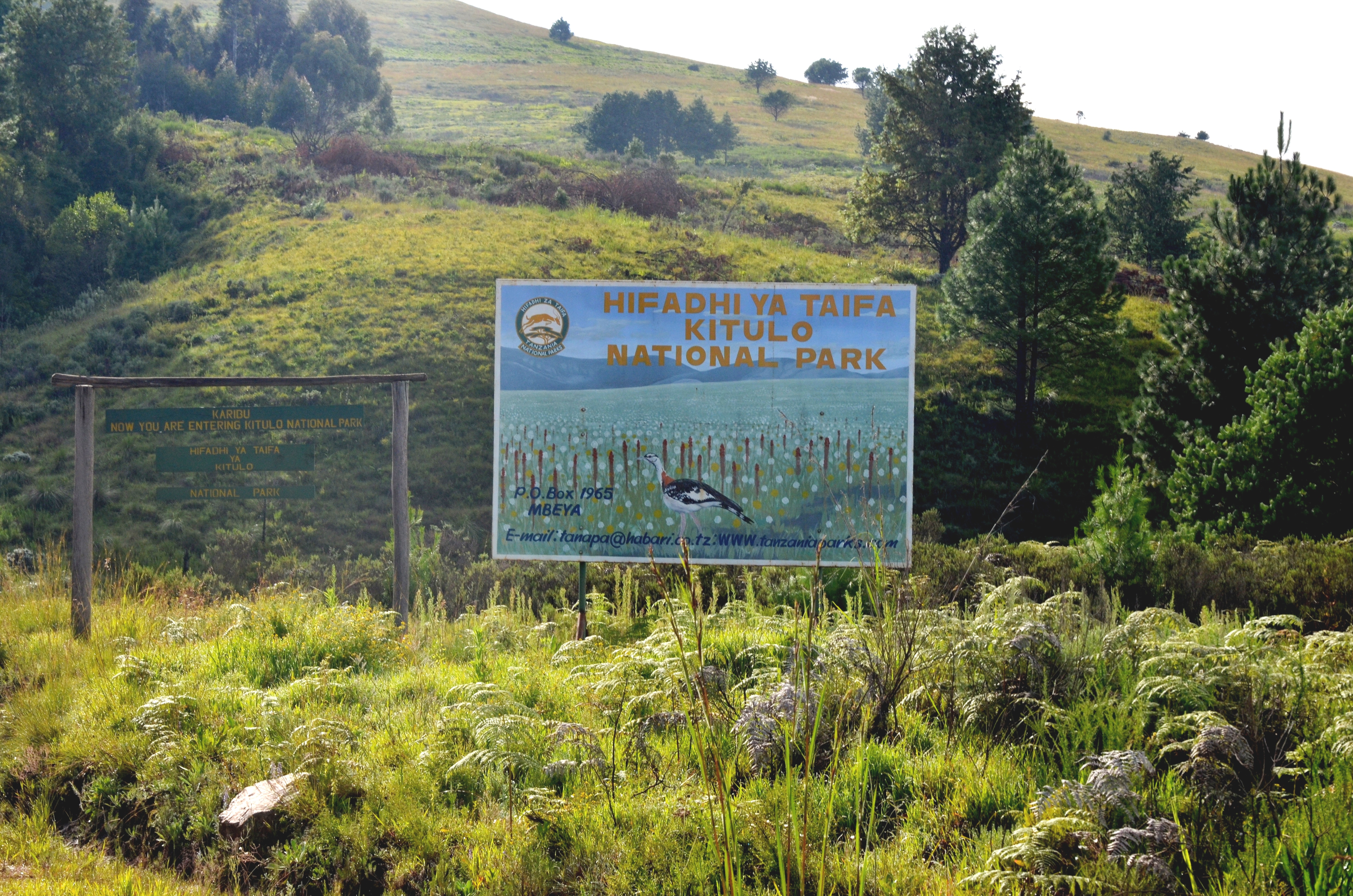
The entry of Kitulo National Park at Kitulo Plateau

The Kitulo Plateau, formerly known as the Elton Plateau, (Swahili: Bustani ya Mungu; meaning 'The Garden of God'), is a plateau in Tanzania's Kipengere Range known for its floral diversity. The plateau is in Kitulo National Park.

This montane grassland area was the first area in East Africa to become a national park because of its unique flora. Botanists have referred to it as the Serengeti of Flowers.

== See also ==
- Wildlife of Tanzania
