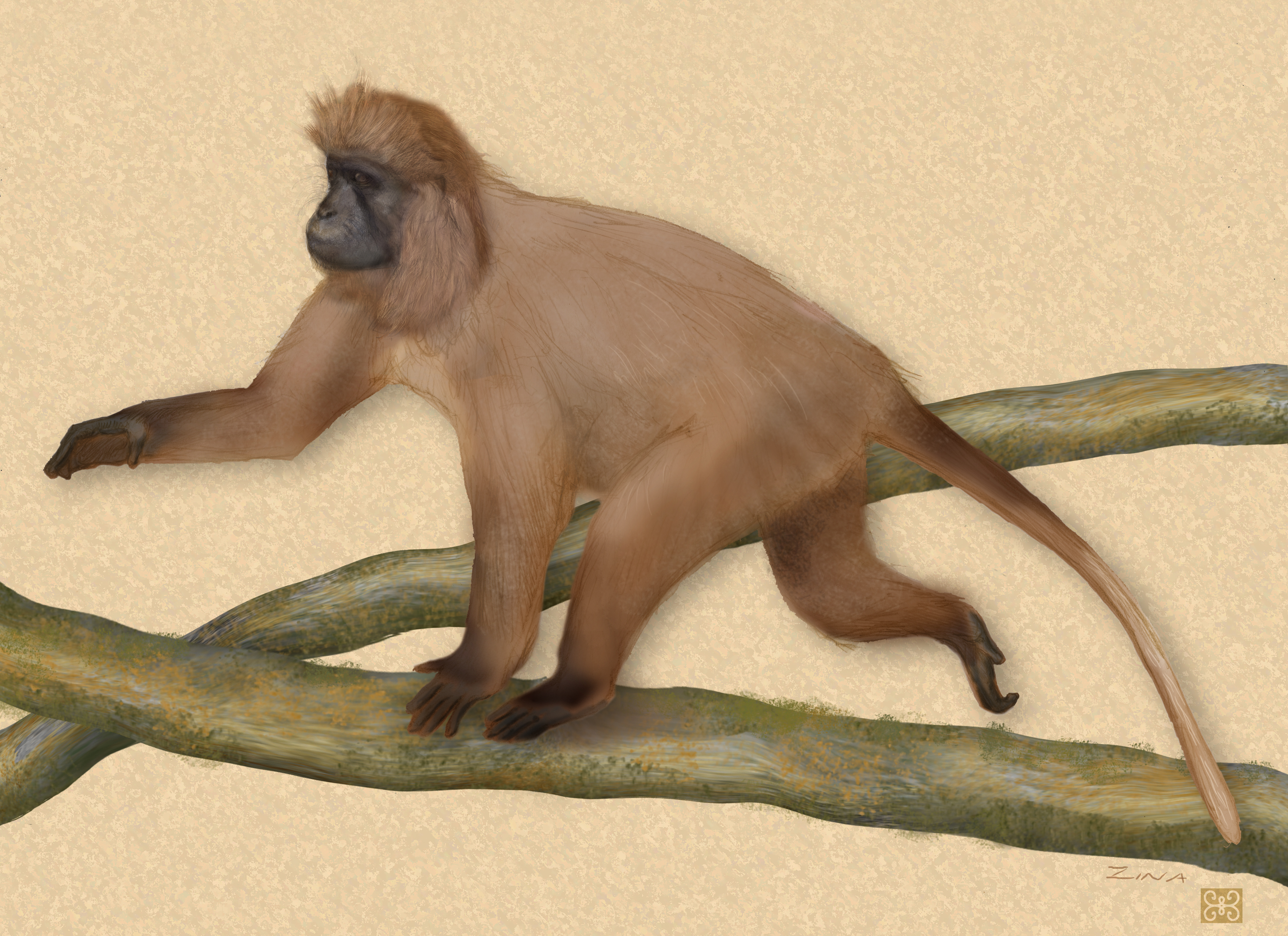

Conservation status
- Endangered (IUCN 3.1)

Scientific classification
- Kingdom: Animalia
- Phylum: Chordata
- Class: Mammalia
- Order: Primates
- Family: Cercopithecidae
- Subfamily: Cercopithecinae
- Tribe: Papionini
- Genus: Rungwecebus; Davenport et al., 2006
- Species: R. kipunji

Binomial name
- Rungwecebus kipunji (Ehardt et al., 2005)
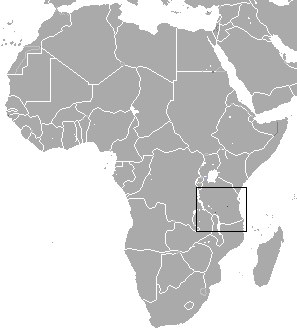

= Kipunji =

Species of Old World monkey

The kipunji (Rungwecebus kipunji), also known as the highland mangabey, is a species of Old World monkey that lives in the highland forests of Tanzania. It was independently described in December 2003 and July 2004, making it the first new African monkey species discovered since 1984. Originally assigned to the genus Lophocebus, genetic and morphological data showed that it is more closely related to the genus Papio. It was subsequently assigned to a new genus, Rungwecebus, named after Mount Rungwe. Rungwecebus is the first new monkey genus described since 1923.

== Description ==
The kipunji's relatively long pelage is light or medium brown with white on the end of the tail and the ventrum. The pelage close to the hands and feet tends to be a medium to dark brown. Its hands, feet, and face are all black. It does not appear to show any sexual dimorphism in relation to pelage coloration. Adult male kipunjis have a body length of 85–90 cm (33–35 in) and are estimated to weigh between 10 and 16 kg (22 and 35 lb).

The kipunji has a distinctive territorial call — a low-pitched "honk-bark". Its nearest relatives are said to make a very different sound, "whoop-gobbles".

The kipunji's pelage coloration and its broad crest of hair on the crown of its head helps to distinguish it from Cercocebus and Lophocebus.

== Distribution and habitat ==
Around 1,800 individuals live in mountainside trees in Tanzania. A census published in 2022 found 59 groups in Livingstone Forest (within Kitulo National Park), Mount Rungwe Nature Reserve, and Madehani Village Forest.

The forest at Rungwe is highly degraded, and fragmentation of the remaining forest threatens to split that population into three smaller populations. The Ndundulu forest is in better shape, but the population there is smaller.

== Conservation ==
The kipunji is classified as an endangered species on the IUCN Red List. It was included in the list of "The World's 25 Most Endangered Primates" in 2006 and 2008.

Its range is restricted to 17.7 km^{2} (6.8 sq mi) of forest in the two isolated regions, the Ndundulu forest and the Rungwe-Livingstone forest.

To combat the endangered status of the Kipunji, efforts to protect the species are significantly enhanced when local commutes surrounding their habitat are aware of their significance and are actively engaged in protecting them. Due to recent conservation efforts, as of 2022, the Kipunji population has increased by 65% and threats due to human activity have decreased by 81%.

== Threats ==
The kipunji faces multiple threats, primarily stemming from human activities such as logging, charcoal making, illegal hunting, and unmanaged resource extraction have been commonplace in the Rungwe-Kitulo forests, leading to habitat fragmentation and degradation. The narrow corridors linking different forest sections are encroached by farmers, further exacerbating the fragmentation of population units. Kipunjis are hunted using log traps and dogs, mainly during January to April in retribution for crop-raiding incidents. Both Kilombero Nature Forest Reserve and Mount Rungwe Nature Reserves lack adequate management resources to counter these threats.
