= Mount Rungwe =

Volcano in Mbeya Region of Tanzania

Coordinates: 9°07′S 33°38′E

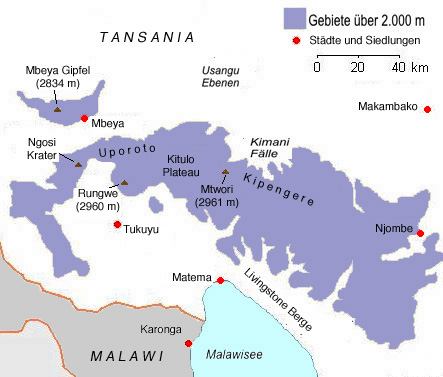

Highest point
- Elevation: 2,981 m (9,780 ft)

Geography
- Location: Mbeya Region
- Parent range: Kipengere Range

Geology
- Mountain type: Stratovolcano
- Last eruption: 1250 AD

Mount Rungwe is a volcanic mountain in Mbeya Region, in Tanzania's Southern Highlands. At an altitude of 2,981 metres (9,780 ft), it is southern Tanzania's second-highest peak. Rungwe's volcano is currently inactive.

== Geography ==
Rungwe stands at the junction of the eastern and western arms of the East African Rift. It dominates the mountainous country at the north-west end of the trough that contains Lake Malawi. The Kipengere Range lies to the east, and the Poroto Mountains lie to the north. Kyejo volcano (or Kiejo) (2176 m) lies to the southeast. The Kyela Plain, which occupies the valley of the East African Rift, lies to the south, extending to Lake Malawi.

The western slopes of the mountain are drained by the Kiwira River, which empties into Lake Malawi.

== Geology ==
Mount Rungwe is the center of the Rungwe Volcanic Province, a region of volcanic mountains that includes Mount Rungwe, Mount Ngozi in the Poroto Mountains and Kiejo. Rungwe Volcanic Province lies at a triple junction of rift valleys. The Lake Malawi Rift extends to the southeast, the Lake Rukwa rift to the northwest, and the Usungu Rift to the northeast. The region has been volcanically active from the late Miocene to historical times. Both Rungwe and Ngozi have had Plinian eruptions since the end of the Ice Age. The region has geothermal activity, including hot springs and warm springs. Rungwe is topped with a 4-km-wide caldera, breached to the WSW. Rungwe had a large explosive eruption about 4000 years ago, and the most recent eruption was about 1200 years ago. Kyejo last erupted around 1800.

== Climate ==
Mount Rungwe has a tropical montane climate. Most rainfall is during the November to April wet season, although mists and light rain occur during the dry season. Nighttime frosts are common from June to August. The southeastern slopes of these mountains receive up to 3 metres (9.8 ft) of rainfall a year, the highest rainfall in Tanzania.

== Ecology ==
The plant communities on Mount Rungwe vary with elevation. The surrounding lowlands are mostly miombo woodlands. Evergreen lower montane forests are found on the lower slopes of the forest reserve, particularly in the southeast. Common trees include Aphloia theiformis, Ficalhoa laurifolia, Maesa lanceolata, Trichocladus ellipticus, Albizia gummifera, and Bersama abyssinica. Upper montane forests are found up to 2600 meters elevation, forming a broken canopy of about 10–25 meters. Common trees include Albizia gummifera, Aphloia theiformis, Bersama abyssinica, Bridelia micrantha, Diospyros whyteana, Hagenia abyssinica, Macaranga kilimandscharica, Maesa lanceolata, Maytenus acuminata, Myrianthus holstii, and Neoboutonia macrocalyx. Astropanax goetzenii is a common creeping vine.

At 2600 meters elevation, the upper montane forests transition to a belt of bamboo covering about 866 hectares, and heathland between 2600 and 2800 meters elevation. The heathland includes species of Erica, Protea, and Aloe, with Hagenia abyssinica, Agarista salicifolia, Catha edulis, Hypericum revolutum, and Maesa lanceolata. The mountaintop is bushed grassland, covering about 300 ha. High-elevation herbs include bracken, Buchnera rungwensis, and Valeriana capensis.

Two amphibians (Phrynobatrachus rungwensis and Probreviceps rungwensis) are named after Mount Rungwe where they were first collected. A genus of monkey, Rungwecebus was named for the mountain in 2005. It was initially thought to be a type of mangabey from the genus Lophocebus, until more detailed genetic analysis showed its closer connection to baboons. Rungwecebus lives on Mt. Rungwe, in the adjacent Livingstone Forest Reserve in the Kipengere Range, and with a disjunct population in the Udzungwa Mountains 250 miles to the east. The Rungwe dwarf galago, a newly identified primate species in the genus Galagoides, is found on Mt. Rungwe and nearby portions of the Poroto and Kipengere mountains. It inhabits montane evergreen and bamboo forests.

== Mount Rungwe Nature Forest Reserve ==
Much of the mountain (13,652.1 ha) was listed as a Catchment Forest in 1949. In 2009 the reserve was upgraded to a Nature Forest Reserve to improve its conservation.
