= Lake Ngozi =

- Lake Ngosi
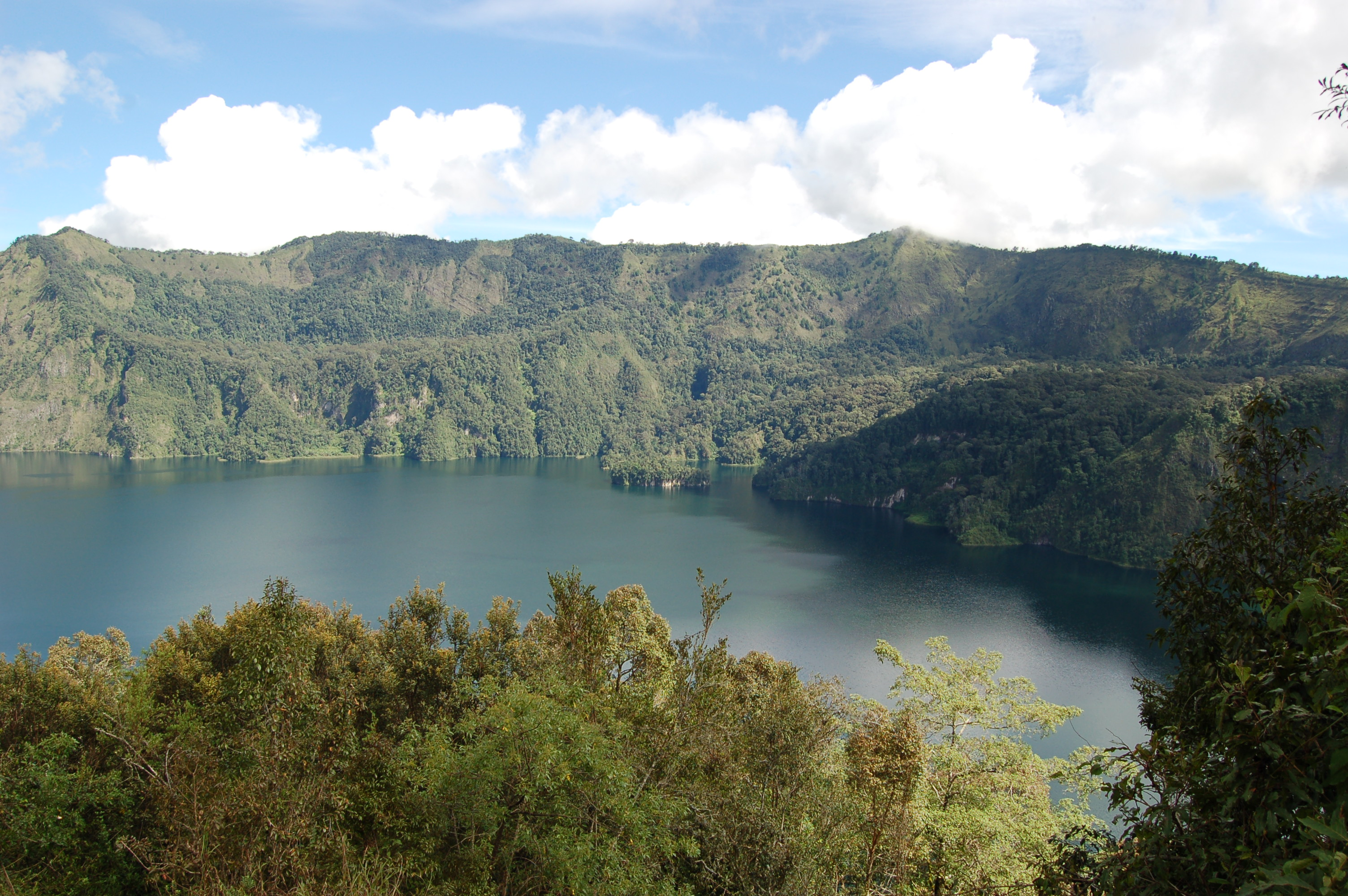

- Location within Tanzania
- Location: Mbeya, Tanzania
- Group: Crater Lakes
- Coordinates: 9.008°S 33.553°E
- Type: Crater lake
- Etymology: Ngosi means ‘The Big One’ in vernacular Kinyakyusa, one of the native tribes of the area
- Catchment area: 4.6 km^{2} (1.8 sq mi)
- Basin countries: Tanzania
- Max. length: 2.5 km (1.6 mi)
- Max. width: 1.6 km (0.99 mi)
- Surface area: 3.1 km^{2} (1.2 sq mi)
- Max. depth: 74 m (243 ft)
- Water volume: 0.0727 km^{3} (0.0174 cu mi)
- Settlements: Igawilo, Uyole

Lake Ngozi (or Lake Ngosi) is the second largest crater lake in Africa. It can be found near Tukuyu, a small town in the highland Rungwe District, Mbeya Region, of southern Tanzania in East Africa. It is part of the Poroto Mountains and the northern rim of the caldera is the highest point in the range. The caldera mostly composed from trachytic and phonolitic lavas. Ngozi is a Holocene caldera that generated the Kitulo pumice 12,000 years ago during a Plinian eruption, most likely in the same eruption that generated the caldera. Other eruption deposits are the Ngozi Tuff (less than thousand years ago) and the Ituwa Surge base surge deposits of uncertain age, but intermediary to the Kitulo pumice and Ngozi Tuff. The youngest activity generated a pyroclastic flow that flowed southwards for 10 km around 1450 CE. Some pyroclastic cones surround the volcano. The walls of the caldera are forested, with the exception of segments scoured by landslides and high cliffs that inhibit access to the water. The inner caldera is forested with Maesa lanceolata, Albizia gummifera and Hagenia abyssinica, far fewer tree species than neighbouring mountains consistent with the recent geological origin of the volcano. The caldera itself is not subjected to hydrothermal activity, but large subaqueous CO^{2} emissions and local legends of the killing power of the lake indicate a danger of limnic eruptions. The lake floor according to echosounding is flat and has no terraces.

The lake does not undergo large scale fluctuations in lake level, with only minor differences between the dry and rainy seasons. Air temperatures above the lake are around 18 °C with only minor seasonal variations.

Sporadically, the forests were occupied by Safwa hunters. Reports in 2013 stated that in the following year a geothermal project would commence in the vicinity of the volcano halfway between Ngozi and the town of Mbeya.

== Local folklore ==
There are a number of local myths and folk tales which surround the volcanic lake, and the surrounding area.

The Nyakyusa People (ethnic group in this area of Southern Tanzania) say that a shaman called Lwembe was chased from his birth village (Ukwama in the Makete area) to the waters of Lake Ngozi after the people had become weary of the deceptive nature of his magic.

Once Lwembe became an inhabitant of the waters edge, the local tribe's cattle began to disappear. It is said that villagers started going missing too if they ventured too close to the waters. Nyakyusa elders dispelled the area by rolling a huge boulder which had been placed in the heart of a fire for three days into the water, while casting their own spells. Since that time, the evils spell on the Lake has not returned.

The most commonly heard myth and folk tale is that of a group of Colonial German soldiers who disposed of treasure into the waters of the lake. They put a spell on the Lake to protect the gold and hamper any other persons' efforts to reclaim it. Some variations of the myth suggest that this caused an emission of poisonous gasses (which we now know could be linked to a Limnic eruption), while others claim that there is a twelve headed snake that protects the treasure and comes out to the surface on sunny days. Whether there ever was a treasure remains a mystery.
