= Kipengere Range =

Mountain range in Njombe Region, Tanzania

The Kipengere Range, also known as the Livingstone Mountains, lies entirely in Njombe Region in southwest Tanzania at the northern end of Lake Nyasa. Near Lake Nyasa they are known as the Kinga Mountains. It is a plateau-like ridge of mountains running southeastwards from the basin of the Great Ruaha River in the north to that of the Ruhuhu River in the south, and forms part of the eastern escarpment of the East African Rift. The range is mostly clad in montane grasslands, renowned for their botanical diversity and displays of flowers, with montane evergreen forests mostly in stream valleys.

Some sources use the names Kipengere Range or Livingstone Mountains to describe the entire range, while others distinguish the Livingstone Mountains as the southwest-facing escarpment which runs along the shore of Lake Malawi, and the Kipengere Range as the high ridge that defines the northeastern edge of the Kitulo Plateau.

== Geography ==
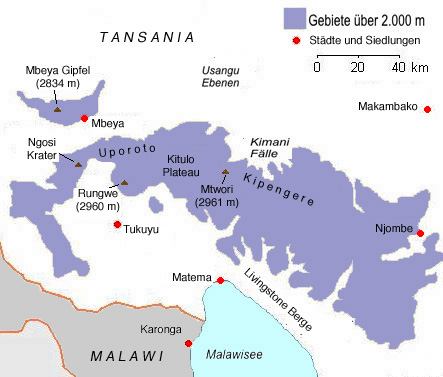
Map showing areas above 2000 meters elevation in the Kipengere and adjoining ranges.

From the town of Mbeya the range runs south-east and forms part of the eastern escarpment of the East African Rift, extending about 100 kilometres (62 mi) down the north-eastern shore of the lake to the Ruhuhu River. The volcanic Poroto Mountains form a north-western extension of the range.

In parts the range presents more the character of a plateau than of a true mountain range, but the latter name may be justified by the fact that they form a comparatively narrow belt of country, which falls considerably to the east as well as to the west. Most of the range lies above 2000 meters elevation. The northern end is well marked in 8° 50′ S by an escarpment falling to the Usangu Plains, the eastern branch of the East African Rift and the basin of the Great Ruaha River. Southwards the range terminates in the deep valley of the Ruhuhu River in 10° 30′ S, the first decided break in the highlands that is reached from the north along the east coast of Lake Malawi. Towards the south the range appears to have a width of some 32 kilometres (20 miles) only, but northwards it widens out to about 64 kilometres (40 miles), though broken here by the depression, drained towards the Great Ruaha, on the south side of which is Mtorwe (2,961 metres (9,715 ft)), the highest known summit of the range.

The Kitulo Plateau, formerly the Elton Plateau, is a high plateau in the northern part of the range, defined by tall ridges running northwest–southeast. Mtorwe and Ishinga (2,688 metres (8,819 ft)) overlook the Great Ruaha River valley, while Chaluhangi (2,933 metres (9,623 ft)) overlooks the Lake Malawi basin. Ngosi (2,621 metres (8,599 ft)) is the main peak in the Poroto Mountains.

At the foot of the mountains on Lake Malawi are the ports of Manda, near the mouth of the Ruhuhu, and Matema, at the north-east corner of the lake.

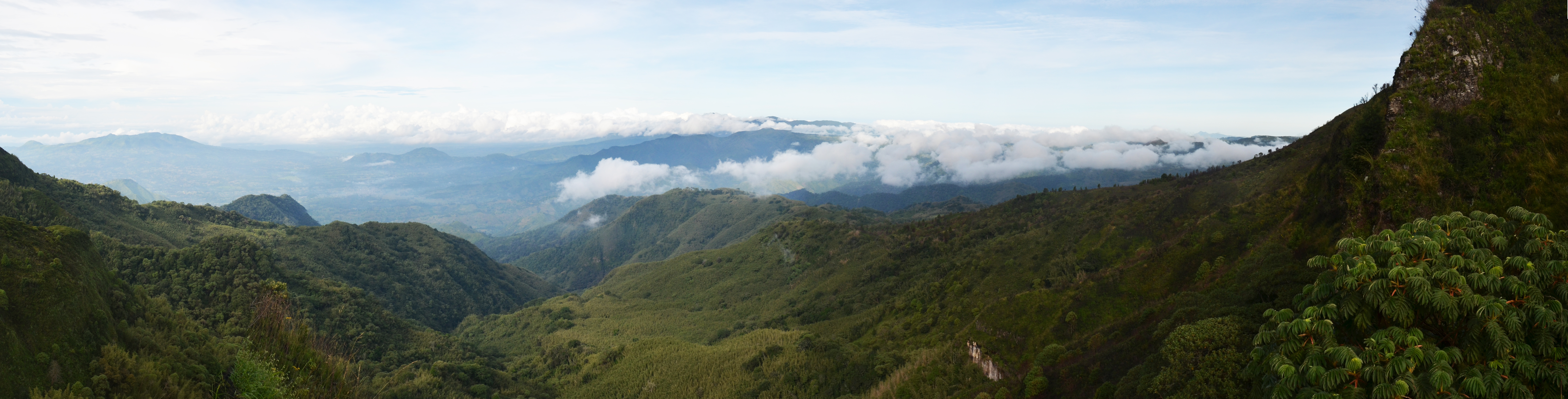
Panorama of the Kipengere Range and its forests taken from the edge of the Kitulo Plateau looking west.

== People ==
The Nyakyusa, Kisi, and Manda people live along the shore of Lake Nyasa along the southwestern escarpment of the range. The Wanji, Magoma, Kinga, Pangwa, Ngoni and Nena people live in the interior of the range.

== Geology ==
Geologically the range is formed of ancient Precambrian rocks. A zone of gneiss runs along the southwestern face of the range overlooking Lake Malawi, in a series of ridges and valleys generally parallel to its axis. The ridge nearest the lake (Mount Jamimbi or Chamembe, at 9° 41′ S), rises to an absolute height of 2,400 metres (7,900 ft), falling 1,900 metres (6,200 ft) almost sheer to the water, the same steep slope continuing beneath the surface. Northeast of Buanyi, as in the eastern half of the range generally, table-topped mountains occur, composed above of horizontally bedded quartzites, sandstones and conglomerates. The Poroto Mountains are volcanic in origin, and in the northwestern portion of the range younger volcanic rocks associated with the Rungwe Volcanic Province overlay the older Precambrian rocks.

== Climate ==
Rainfall comes mostly from convectional thunderstorms originating above Lake Malawi. Mean annual rainfall on the Kitulo Plateau is 1500 mm, and rainfall is greater at higher elevations on slopes facing the lake. Most rainfall occurs during the November to May rainy season, and April is the wettest month. There is a May to October dry season, with nightly frosts common between June and August. Temperate crops can be raised with success.

== Ecology ==
The range is generally covered in montane grassland. The grasslands are home to 350 species of plants, including numerous ground orchids, geophytes, and other afro-alpine plants. During the wet season the montane grasslands are carpeted with numerous flowers. Many species are limited to the Kipengere Range and nearby highlands, and three – Brachystelma kituloensis, Impatiens rosulata and Pterygodium ukingense – are limited the Kitulo Plateau.

Montane evergreen forests occur in river valleys and hollows. The south-facing slopes at the northwestern end of the range, which were formerly the Livingstone Forest Reserve and are now part of Kitulo National Park, have the most extensive areas of montane evergreen forest. The Ndumbi forest, at the eastern end of Kitulo National Park, has montane evergreen and East African cedar (Juniperus procera) forests. Thickets of bamboo (Yushania alpina) can be found between the upper montane forests and the high altitude grasslands.

The range is surrounded at lower elevations by miombo woodland — Eastern miombo woodlands to the north, east, and south, and Central Zambezian miombo woodlands to the west.

== Protected areas ==
Kitulo National Park was created in 2005, and covers an area of 465.4 km^{2}. The new national park incorporated the Livingstone Forest Reserve (240.34 km²) and Ndumbi Valley forest Reserve (27.71 km², est. 1956). The forest reserves protected the range's largest tracts of montane evergreen forest and bamboo thickets, and the park also includes the Kitulo Plateau's montane grasslands lying between the two forest reserves, and montane grasslands to the southeast.

Mpanga-Kipengere Game Reserve was created in 2002, and covers an area of 1,574 km^{2} in the northeastern portion of the range, and an adjacent portion of the Usangu Plains. The game reserve incorporated the 350.78 km^{2} Kipengere Range Forest Reserve, established in 1958. The proposed Ndukunduku forest reserve (27.19 km²) would connect Kitulo National Park and Mpanga-Kipengere Game Reserve.

Irungu Forest Reserve, 240.32 km^{2}, lies in the northwestern edge of the range, and abuts Kitulo National Park on the south. Chimala Scarp Forest Reserve, on the northern escarpment of the range overlooking the Usangu Plains lying to the north, was established in 1960 and covers and area of 180.68 km².

Protected areas in the southern part of the range are not as extensive, as well-protected, or as studied as those in the north. They include the Madenge (1,146 ha), Mdando (5,140 ha), Msiora (315 ha) and Sakaranyumo (840 ha) forest reserves.
