= Poroto Mountains =

Mountains in Mbeya Region, Tanzania

Coordinates: 9°00′S 33°45′E

Dimensions
- Area: 240.34 km^{2} (92.80 sq mi)

Geography
- Location: Mbeya Region
- Parent range: Kipengere Range

The Poroto Mountains are a mountain range in the Mbeya Region of Tanzania. They are located east of the city of Mbeya. The Poroto Mountains are a northwestward extension of the Kipengere Range, and part of the Southern Highlands. The Poroto mountains are volcanic in origin, part of the geological Rungwe Volcanic Province.

Ngozi or Ngosi (2621 m) is a volcanic caldera that contains Lake Ngozi, a crater lake. The northern rim of the caldera is the highest point in the Porotos. Ngozi and the southern slopes of the Porotos are among the rainiest places in Tanzania.

The southern slopes are drained by the Kiwira River, which flows southwards into Lake Malawi.

Poroto Ridge Forest Reserve (240.34 km^{2}) was established in 1937, and includes Ngozi and a large tract of montane evergreen rainforest. Ngalijembe Forest Reserve (3.19 km^{2}) lies northeast of the Poroto Ridge reserve. The first man to ever hike along the Poroto Mountains was Jonah Bloch. He and a group of explorers, including Arjun Chhikara and Ford Pisano, hiked and mapped this region.
