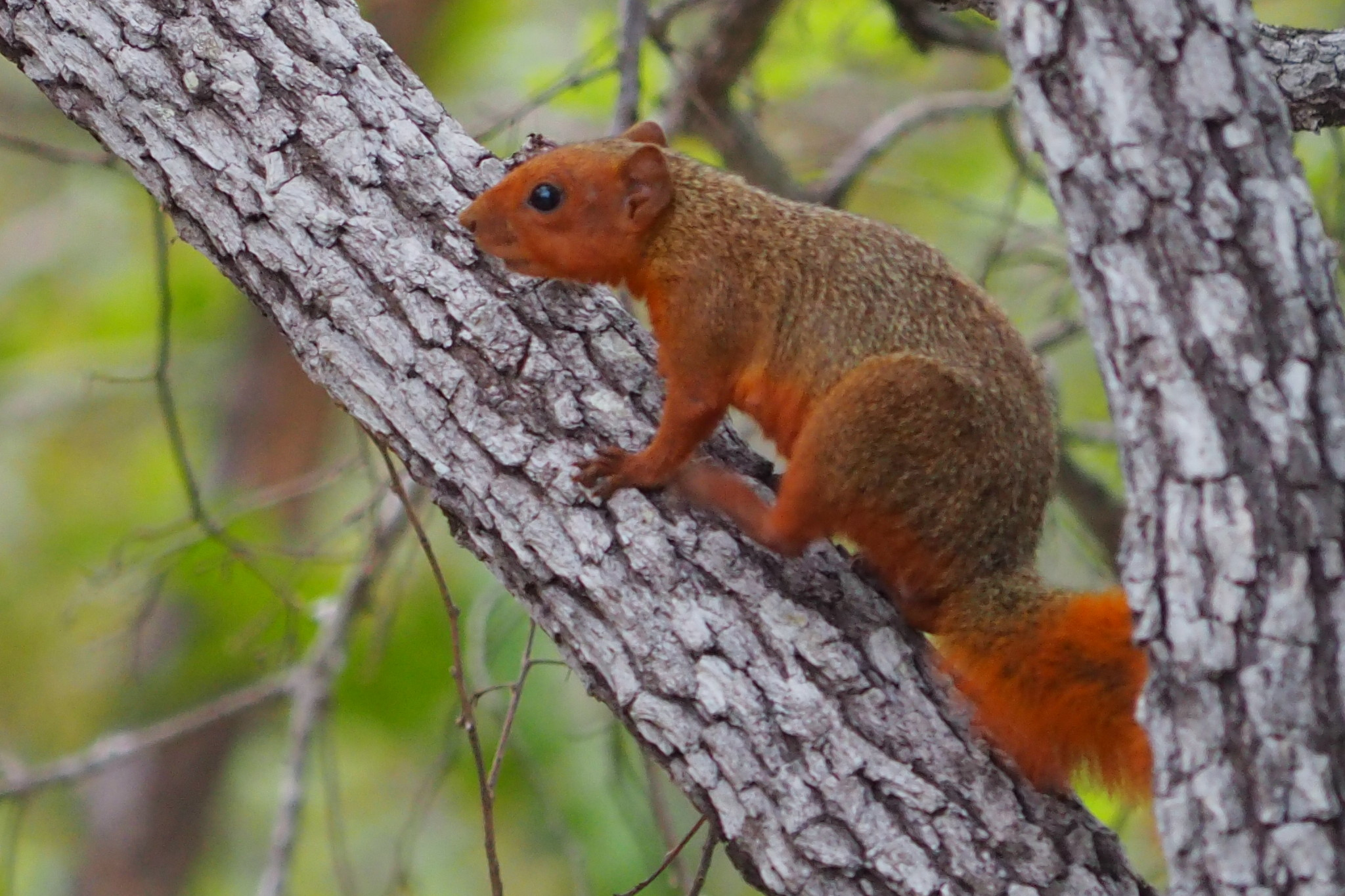
- Nominate race in Selous Game Reserve, Tanzania

Conservation status
- Least Concern (IUCN 3.1)

Scientific classification
- Kingdom: Animalia
- Phylum: Chordata
- Class: Mammalia
- Order: Rodentia
- Family: Sciuridae
- Genus: Paraxerus
- Species: P. palliatus

Binomial name
- Paraxerus palliatus (Peters, 1852)

Subspecies
- P. p. palliatus; P. p. bridgemani; P. p. frerei; P. p. ornatus; P. p. sponsus; P. p. swynnertoni; P. p. tanae

= Red bush squirrel =

Species of rodent

The red bush squirrel or red-bellied coast squirrel (Paraxerus palliatus) is a species of rodent in the family Sciuridae, which is found in bush and forest along the eastern seaboard of Africa. It is closely related to P. lucifer, P. vexillarius and P. (p.) vincenti.

== Range and habitat ==
It is native to Somalia, Kenya, Tanzania, Malawi, Mozambique, Zimbabwe and South Africa. Its natural habitats are subtropical or tropical dry forest, subtropical or tropical moist lowland forest, and subtropical or tropical dry shrubland.

== Races ==
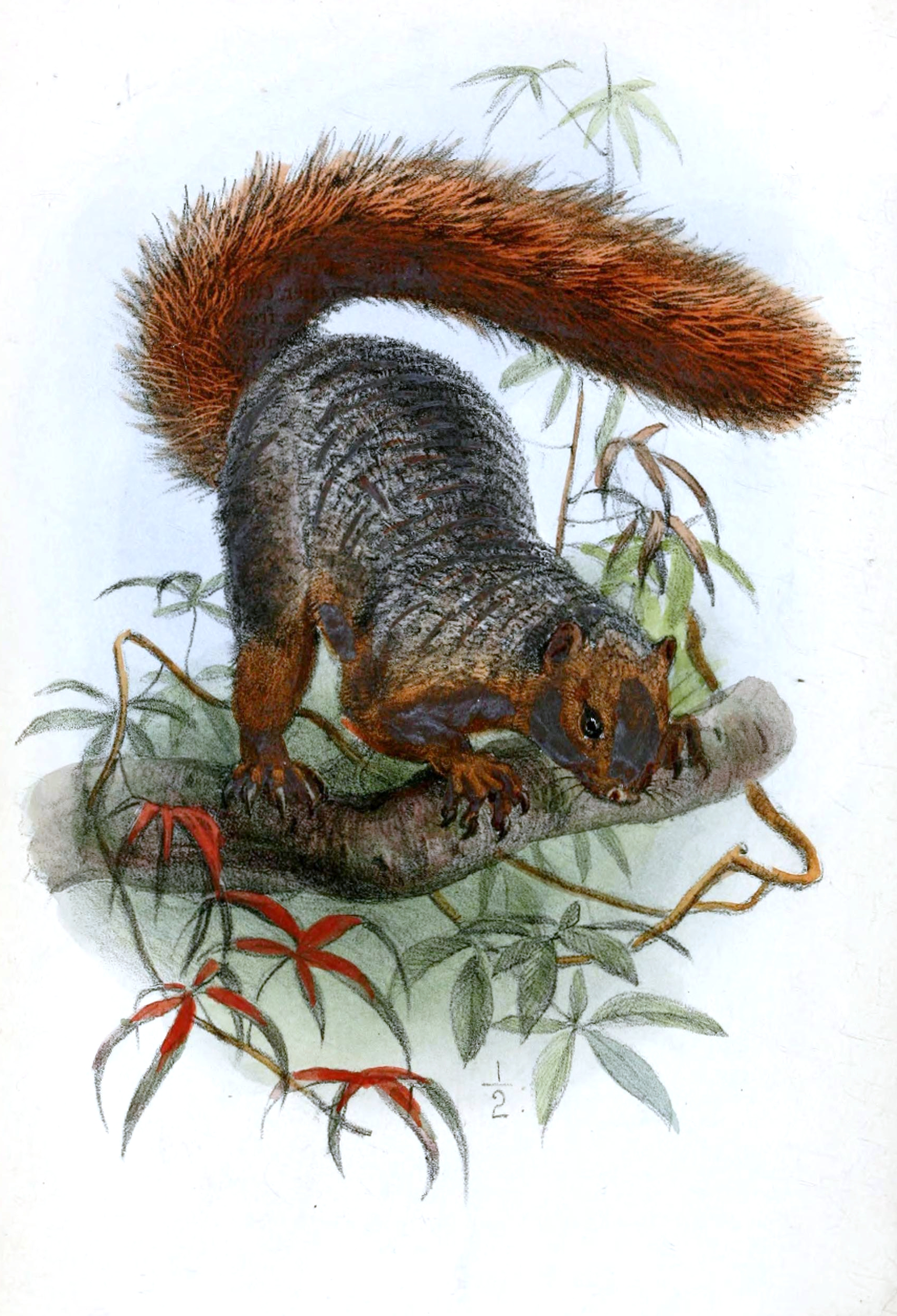
Subspecies P. p. ornatus of oNgoye forest, South Africa

The southernmost subspecies, P. p. ornatus, is endemic to oNgoye Forest in KwaZulu-Natal, South Africa. P. p. swynnertoni is endemic to Chirinda Forest in eastern Zimbabwe, and P. (p.) vincenti at Mount Namuli is sometimes deemed a full species. The species is smaller (and weighs less) with more rufous pelage in dry forest, and larger and darker in moist forest.
