= Southern Rift montane forest–grassland mosaic =

Ecoregion in Africa

Southern Rift montane forest-grassland mosaic
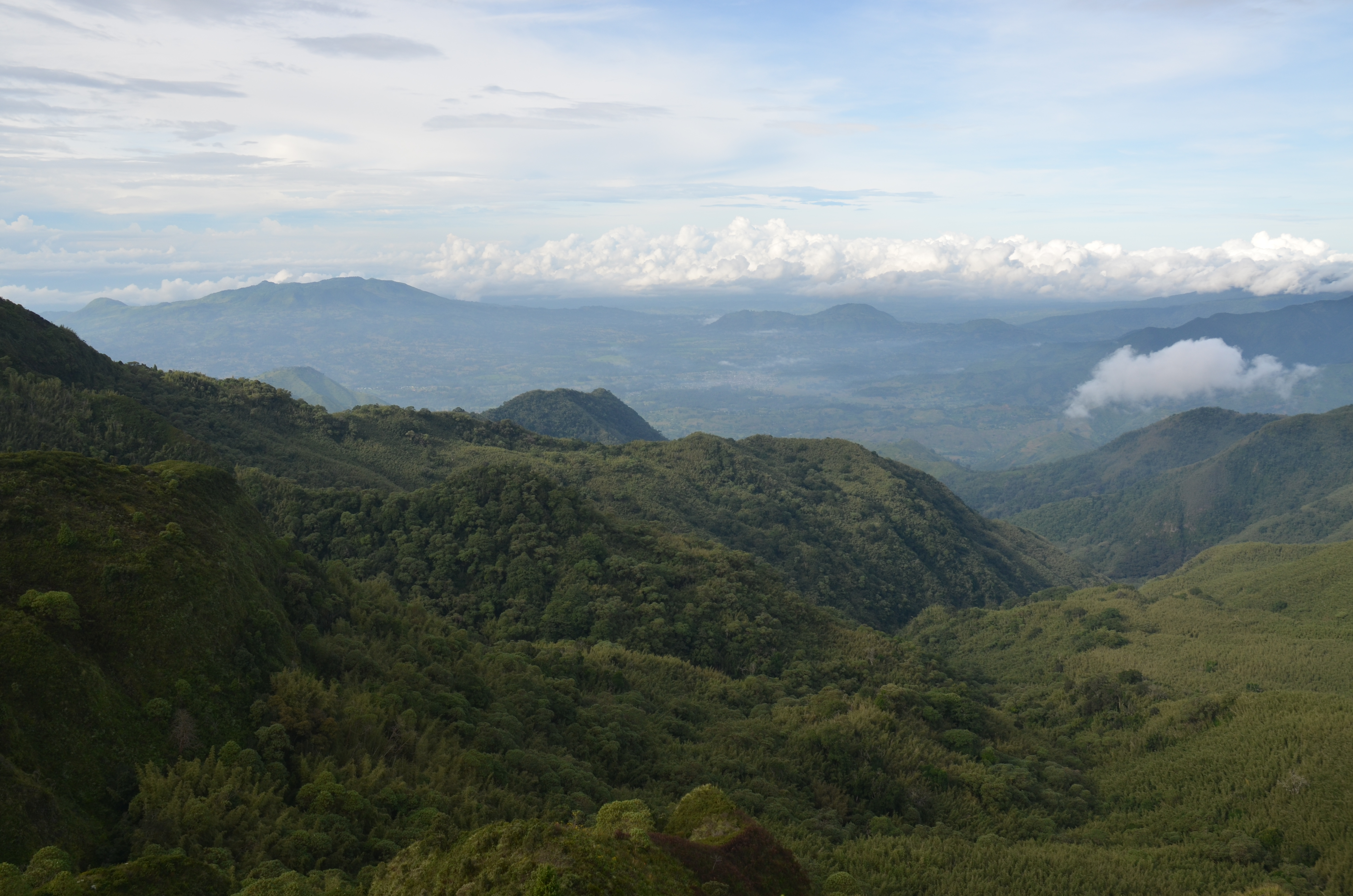
- Livingstone Forest in the Kipengere Range

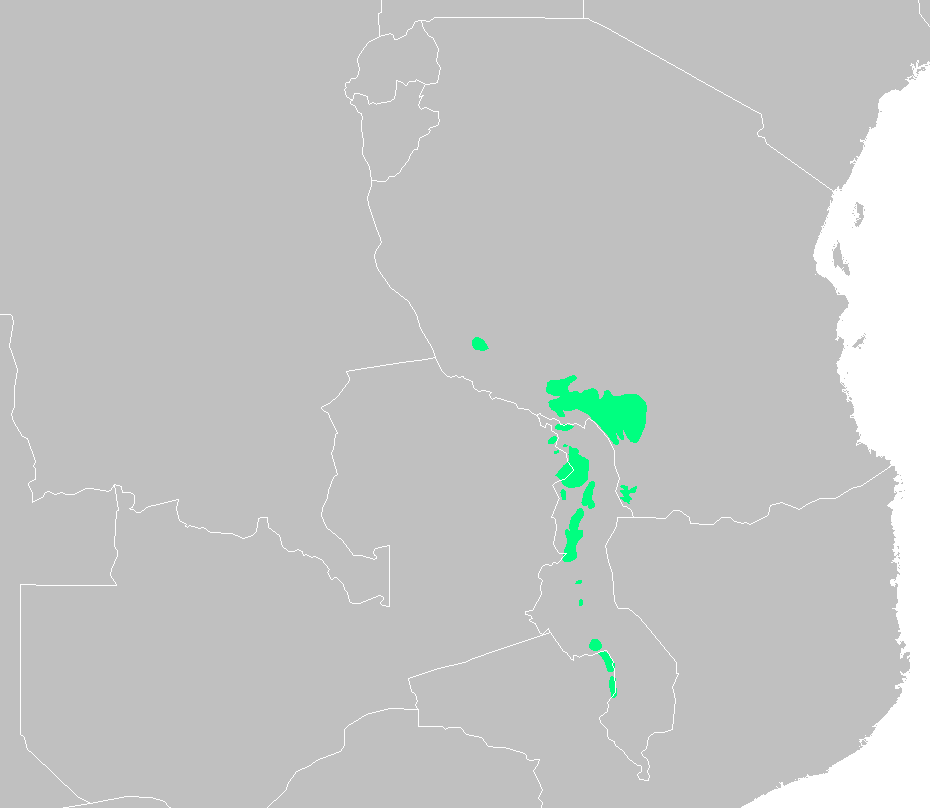
- map of the Southern Rift montane forest-grassland mosaic ecoregion

Ecology
- Realm: Afrotropic
- Biome: Montane grasslands and shrublands

Geography
- Area: 33,400 km^{2} (12,900 mi^{2})
- Countries: Malawi, Mozambique, Tanzania, and Zambia
- Coordinates: 9.905796°S 34.639248°E

Conservation
- Conservation status: critical/endangered

The South Malawi montane forest-grassland mosaic is a montane grasslands and shrublands ecoregion of Tanzania, Malawi, Mozambique, and Zambia.

The ecoregion encompasses several high mountains and plateaus north and east of Lake Malawi.

== Climate ==
The ecoregion has a tropical highlands climate, generally cooler and more humid than the surrounding lowlands. Most rainfall occurs during the November to April wet season. Most rain comes from convectional thunderstorms originating over Lake Malawi.

== Flora ==
The predominant plant communities include montane grasslands, shrublands, and evergreen forests.

== Fauna ==
Near-endemic mammals include the Black and red bush squirrel (Paraxerus lucifer), Swynnerton's bush squirrel (Paraxerus vexillarius), Greater hamster-rat (Beamys major), Grant's bushbaby (Galagoides granti), Desperate shrew (Crocidura desperata), and Tanzanian vlei rat (Otomys lacustris)

The Rungwe dwarf galago, a newly-identified species in genus Galagoides, is found on Mount Rungwe and nearby in the Poroto Mountains and Kipengere Range in Tanzania. It inhabits montane evergreen and bamboo forests. Specimens were first collected in the 1930s, but were identified as different species. A formal description of the species is presently being made.

== Protected areas ==
Protected areas in the ecoregion include:

- On Tanzania's Ufipa Plateau, the Mbizi Forest Reserve north of Sumbawanga.
- In the Kipengere Range, Kitulo National Park, Mpanga-Kipengere Game Reserve, and the Irungu (240.32 km²), Chimala Scarp (180.68 km²), Madenge (1,146 ha), Mdando (5,140 ha), Msiora (315 ha) and Sakaranyumo (840 ha) forest reserves.
- In Tanzania's Umalila Mountains, the Umalila Catchment Forest Reserve, Mpara Catchment Forest Reserve, Kyosa Forest Reserve, Msimwa Forest Reserve, and Iyondo Forest Reserve.
- Matengo Highlands
- In northern Malawi's Misuku Hills, the Matipa, Mughese, and Wilindi forest reserves.
- Mafinga Hills forest reserves in Malawi and Zambia.
- On the Nyika Plateau, Nyika National Park in Malawi, and Nyika National Park in Zambia.
- In the Viphya Mountains, various forest reserves including Uzumara and South Viphya.
- Chipata Mountain in Nkhotakota Wildlife Reserve.
- Ntchisi Mountain Forest Reserve on Ntchisi Mountain
- Dedza Mountain Forest Reserve and Chirobwe, Mua Livuzeli, and other forest reserves the Malawian Kirk Range. The Mozambican portion of the Kirk Range is unprotected.
