= Songwe Bridge =

Songwe Bridge Daraja la Songwe (Swahili)
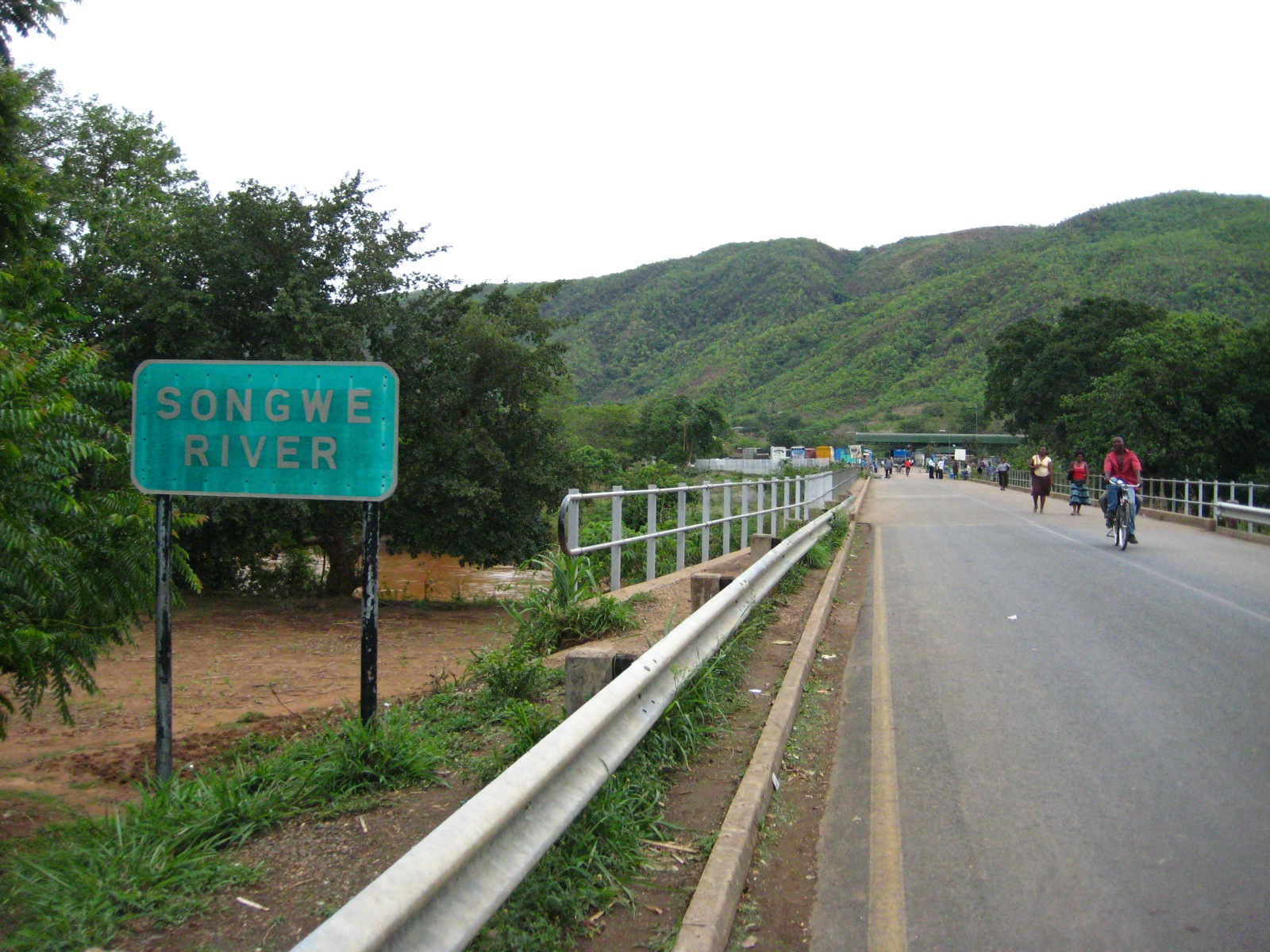
- Coordinates: 9°35′22.52″S 33°46′34.67″E
- Crosses: Songwe River

Characteristics
- Total length: 50 metres (160 ft)

History
- Opened: 1988

Songwe Bridge is an international bridge across the Songwe River linking Malawi and Tanzania.

== See also ==
- Malawi-Tanzania border
- List of international bridges
