= Shongwe =

Shongwe is a surname. Notable people with the surname include:

- Abel Shongwe (born 1966), Swazi footballer
- Anne Shongwe (born 1964), Kenyan entrepreneur
- Crossby Vusi Shongwe (fl. from 2024), South African politician
- Dzeliwe Shongwe (1927–2003), queen regent of Eswatini
- Jabulani Shongwe (born 1990), South African soccer player
- Jeremiah Shongwe (born 1948), South African judge
- Lungile Shongwe (born 1983), South African actress
- Mlandvo Shongwe (born 1993), Swazi sprinter
- Myron Shongwe (born 1981), South African soccer player
- Sibs Shongwe-La Mer (born 1991), South African film director
- Sibusiso Shongwe (born 2001), South African rugby union player
- Sidumo Shongwe (born 1981), Liswati footballer
- Thandi Shongwe (born 1962), South African politician
- Vusi Shongwe (born 1958), South African politician
- Wendy Shongwe (born 2003), South African soccer player
- Xolane Shongwe (fl. from 2017), South African cricketer

== See also ==
- Songwe
- Mahushe Shongwe Reserve
