= Kirk Range =

Plateau in southwestern Malawi

The Kirk Range is a plateau in southwestern Malawi, extending in a north–south direction and skirting the southwestern shore of Lake Malawi and the western border of the Shire River valley. The range includes several peaks higher than 1800 meters in elevation. The northern end of the range overlooks the Central Region plateau and Lake Malawi. The range forms the Malawi-Mozambique border, and the divide between the watersheds of Mozambique's Revúboé River to the west and Malawi's Shire River to the east. The Lisungwe and Mkulumadzi (Wamkulumadzi) rivers are tributaries of the Shire that originate in the Kirk Range.

The lower slopes are part of the Southern miombo woodlands ecoregion. Higher elevations include pockets of high-altitude forests, grasslands, and shrublands that make up the Southern Rift montane forest-grassland mosaic ecoregion.

The Dedza-Salima, Mua Livulezi, Chirobwe (Chilobwe), Mvai, Dzonze (Dzonzi), and Tsamba forest reserves cover parts of the range.

It is named after Sir John Kirk.
