= Umalila Mountains =

Mountain range in Tanzania

- Location within Tanzania

Geography
- Country: Tanzania
- Range coordinates: 09°18′43″S 33°26′42″E
- Parent range: Southern Highlands
- Borders on: Poroto Mountains

The Umalila Mountains are a mountain range in southern Tanzania, on the border with Malawi. The Umalila Mountains are part of Tanzania's Southern Highlands.

The mountains are named for the Malila people.

== Geography ==
The Umalila Mountains lie northwest of Lake Malawi, and trend roughly northwest-southeast. They form part of the western edge of the East African Rift. The Kyela Plain lies to the east and northeast of the mountains in the rift valley. The volcanic Poroto Mountains and Mount Rungwe lie to the northeast across the Kiwira River. The town of Mbeya lies to the north, and plateaus to the west.

The Songwe River drains the western and southern slopes of the mountains, and separate the Umalila Mountains from the Misuku Hills in neighboring Malawi. The Kiwira River drains the eastern slopes. Both rivers empty into Lake Malawi.

== Climate ==
The mountains have a tropical montane climate. Rainfall is mostly during the November through April wet season, although higher elevations experience mists and light rain during the May through August dry season. The highlands are cooler than the surrounding lowlands, with annual temperatures between 13°C and 19°C. The Umalila Mountains are drier than Mount Rungwe and the Poroto Mountains to the northeast.

== Ecology ==
The natural vegetation at lower elevations is miombo woodland, which extends up to 2,000 ft (610 m). Higher elevations are home to montane grasslands and patches of montane evergreen forest, part of the Southern Rift montane forest-grassland mosaic ecoregion. The mountains are extensively cultivated, and little natural forest remains.

== Protected areas ==
Forest reserves include the Umalila Catchment Forest Reserve (CFR) (3,796 ha), Mpara CFR (1,048 ha), Kyosa Local Authority Forest Reserve (LA-FR) (957 ha), Msimwa LA-FR (727 ha), and Iyondo LA-FR (973 ha).
