= Songwe =

Songwe may refer to:

- Songwe Region, Tanzania
  - Songwe District in this region
- Songwe Airport, Tanzania
- Songwe Hydroelectric Power Station
- Songwe River, on the Malawi-Tanzania border
  - Songwe Bridge, on the river
- Safwa language, also known as Songwe dialect
