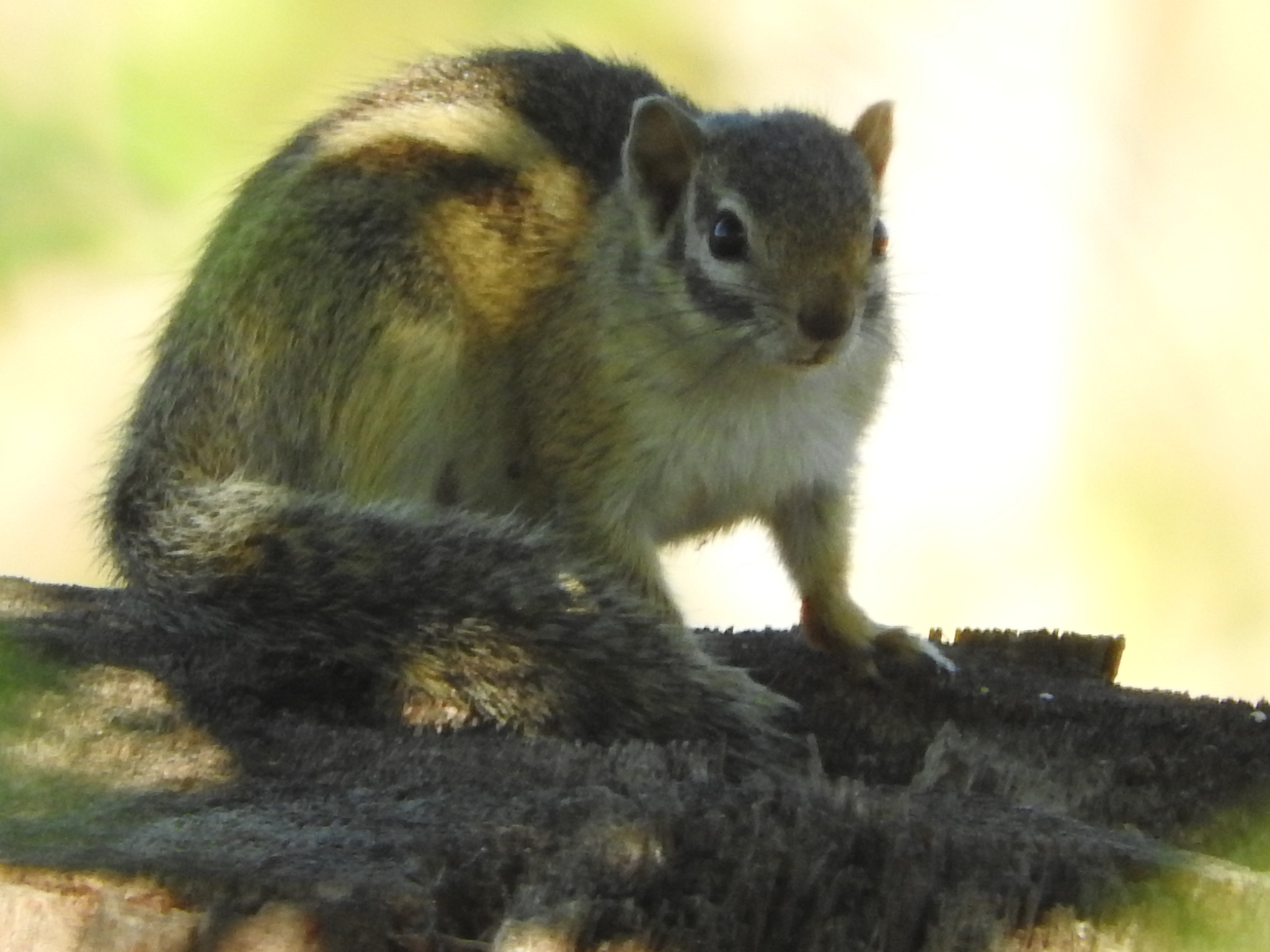

Conservation status
- Least Concern (IUCN 3.1)

Scientific classification
- Kingdom: Animalia
- Phylum: Chordata
- Class: Mammalia
- Order: Rodentia
- Family: Sciuridae
- Genus: Paraxerus
- Species: P. flavovittis

Binomial name
- Paraxerus flavovittis (Peters, 1852)

Subspecies
- P. f. flavovittis; P. f. exgeanus; P. f. ibeanus; P. f. mossambicus

= Striped bush squirrel =

Species of rodent

The striped bush squirrel (Paraxerus flavovittis) is a species of rodent in the family Sciuridae found in Kenya, Malawi, Mozambique, and Tanzania. Its natural habitats are moist savanna and plantations.
