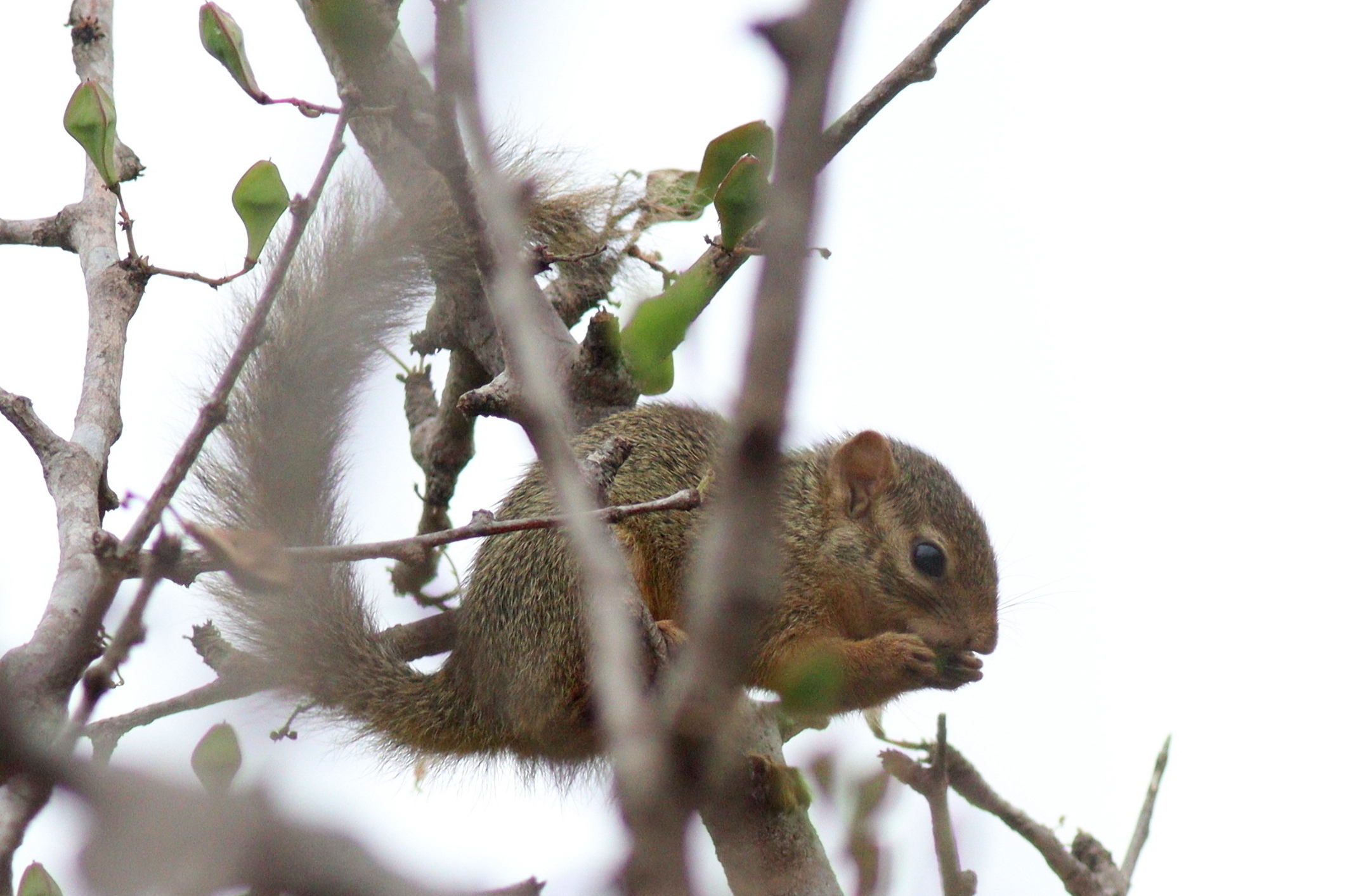

Conservation status
- Least Concern (IUCN 3.1)

Scientific classification
- Kingdom: Animalia
- Phylum: Chordata
- Class: Mammalia
- Order: Rodentia
- Family: Sciuridae
- Genus: Paraxerus
- Species: P. ochraceus

Binomial name
- Paraxerus ochraceus (Huet, 1880)

Subspecies
- P. o. ochraceus; P. o. affinis; P. o. animosus; P. o. aruscensis; P. o. electus; P. o. ganana; P. o. jacksoni; P. o. kahari

= Ochre bush squirrel =

Species of rodent

The ochre bush squirrel (Paraxerus ochraceus) is a species of rodent in the family Sciuridae found in Kenya, Somalia, and Tanzania. Its natural habitat is dry savanna.
