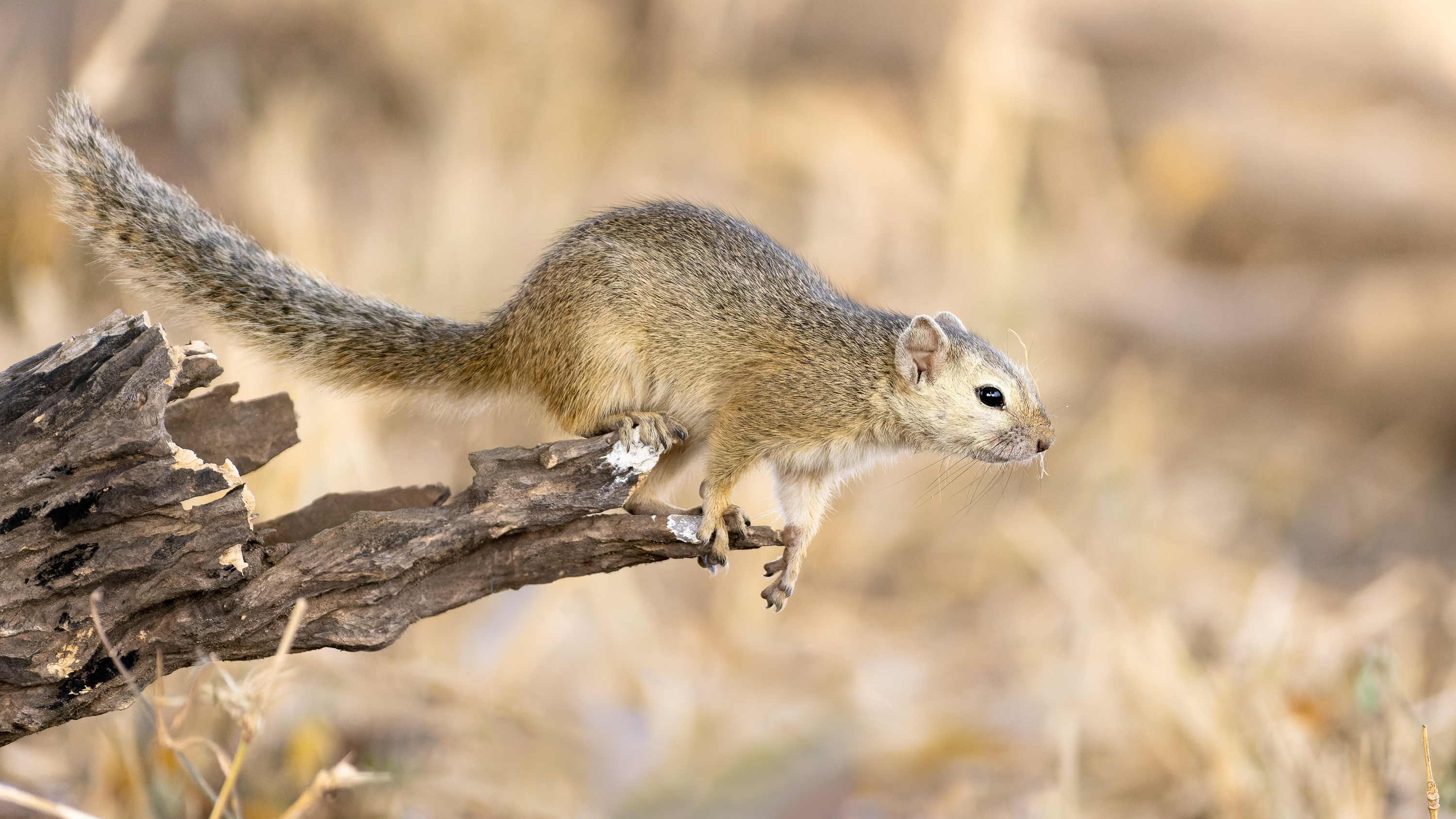

Conservation status
- Least Concern (IUCN 3.1)

Scientific classification
- Kingdom: Animalia
- Phylum: Chordata
- Class: Mammalia
- Order: Rodentia
- Family: Sciuridae
- Genus: Paraxerus
- Species: P. cepapi

Binomial name
- Paraxerus cepapi (A. Smith, 1836)

Subspecies
- P. c. cepapi; P. c. bororensis; P. c. carpi; P. c. cepapoides; P. c. chobiensis; P. c. phalaena; P. c. quotus; P. c. sindi; P. c. soccatus; P. c. yulei
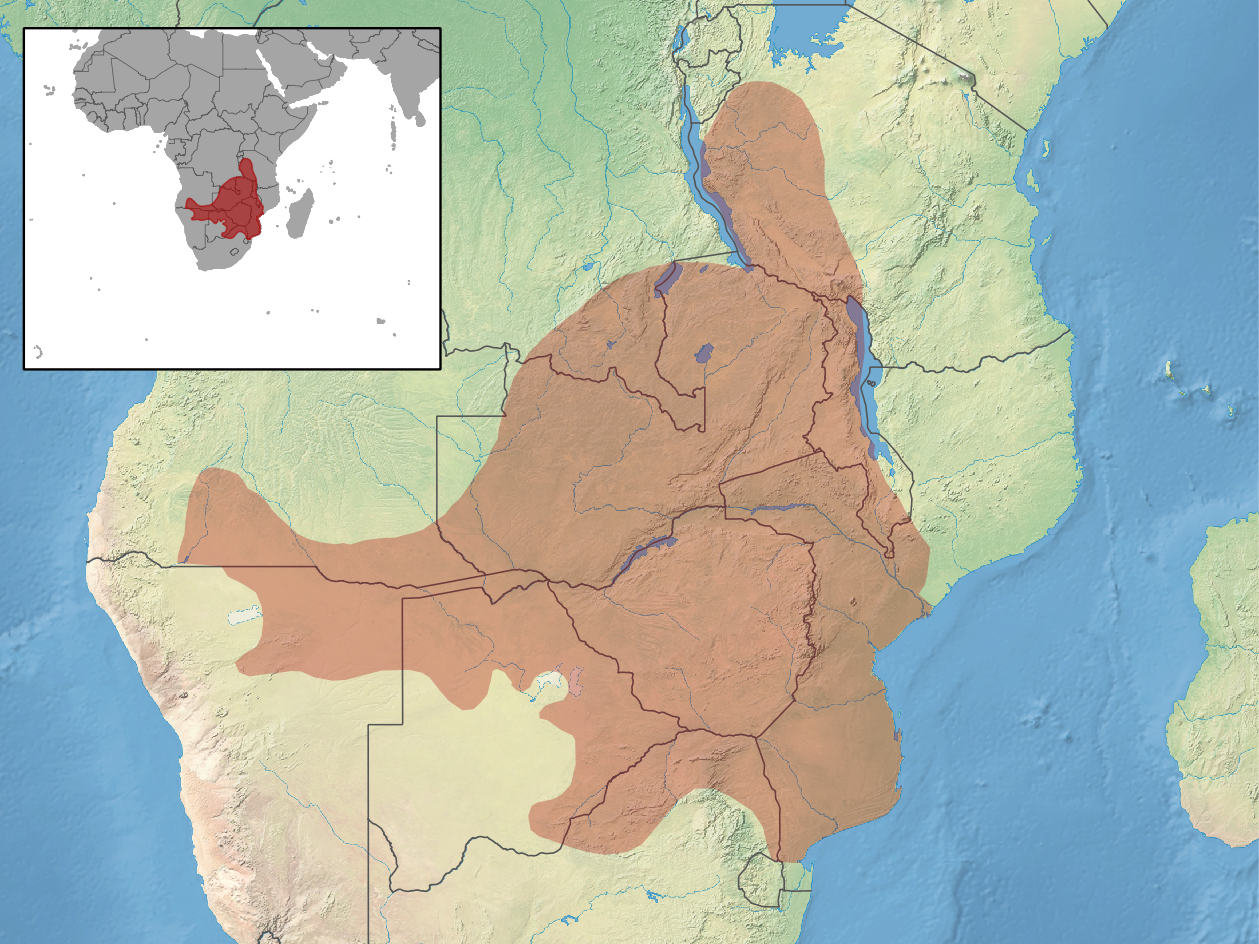
- native range

= Smith's bush squirrel =

Species of rodent

Smith's bush squirrel (Paraxerus cepapi), also known as the yellow-footed squirrel or tree squirrel, is an African bush squirrel which is native to woodlands of the southern Afrotropics.

== Range ==
It is found in Angola, Botswana, the Democratic Republic of the Congo, Malawi, Mozambique, Namibia, South Africa, Tanzania, Zambia, and Zimbabwe. It is a common rodent which is diurnal by nature.

== Appearance ==
Its total length is 350 mm (14 in), half of which is tail; weight 200 g (7.1 oz). The coat colour varies throughout the region. In the western and arid parts of its range, it is pale grey, and in the eastern localities, more brown. Its head and legs are a rusty colour. Colouration on the chest varies from yellowish to buff in the east, to white in the west. This squirrel's belly is white. These alert and ever busy creatures carry their long tails extended backwards.

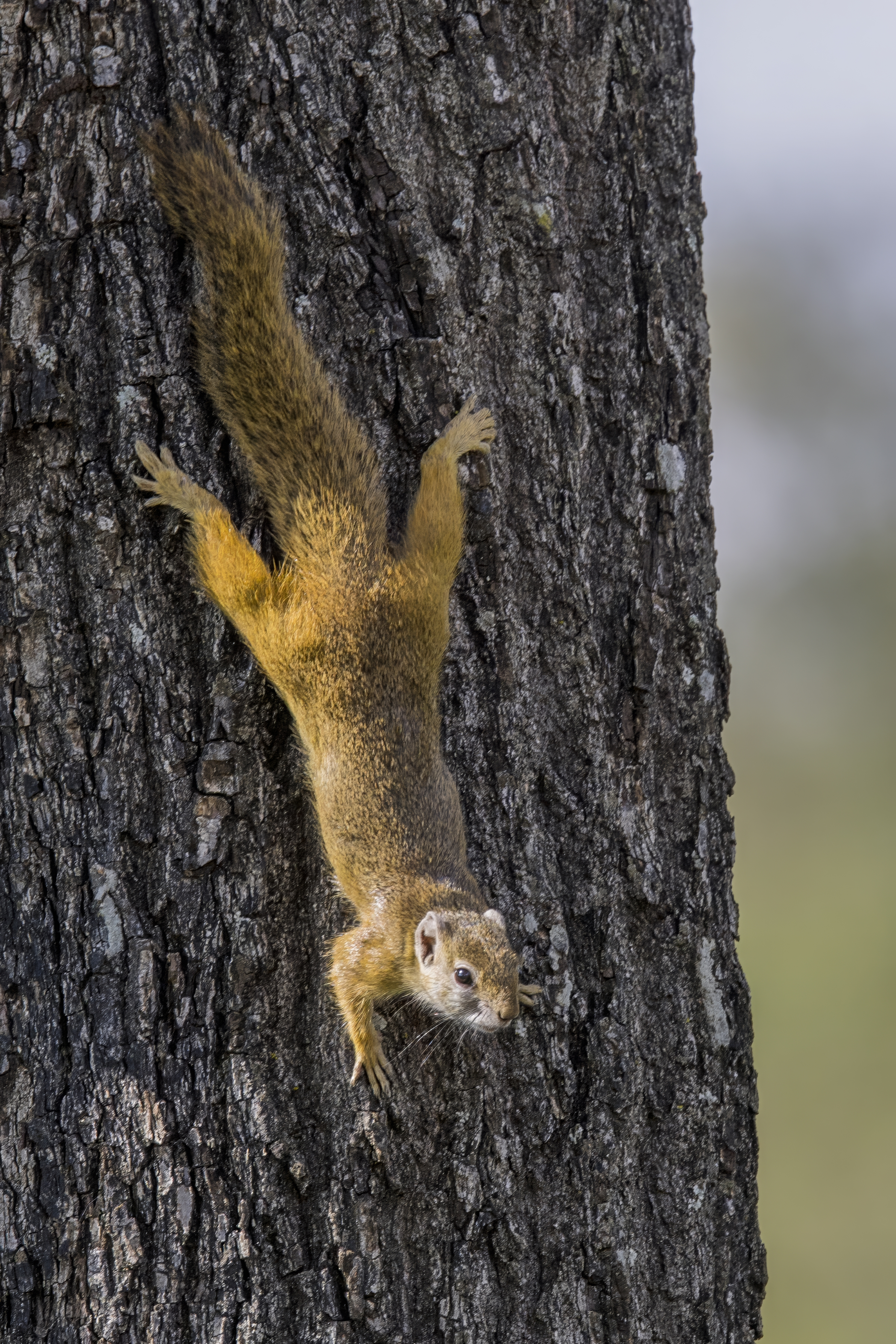

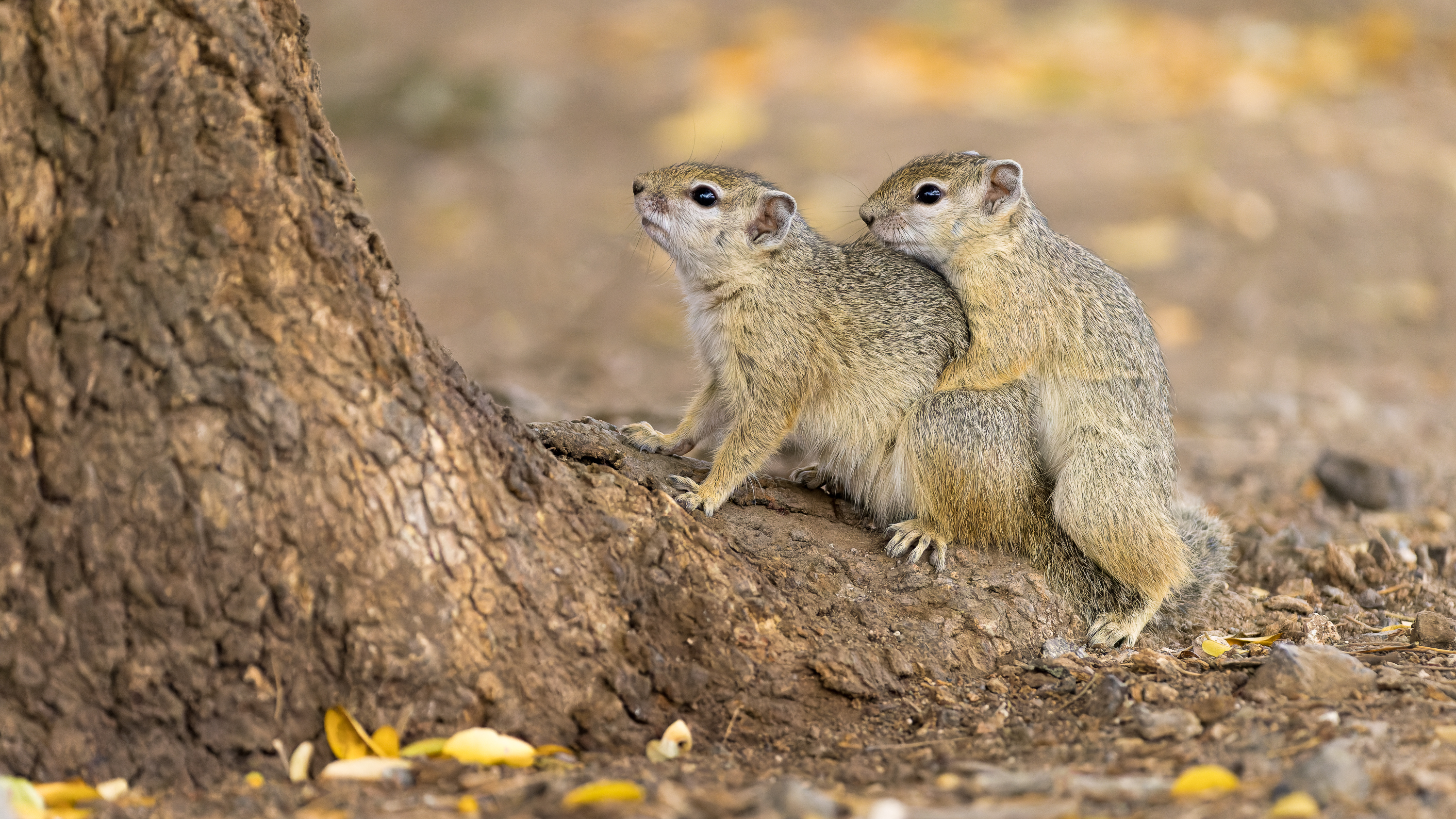

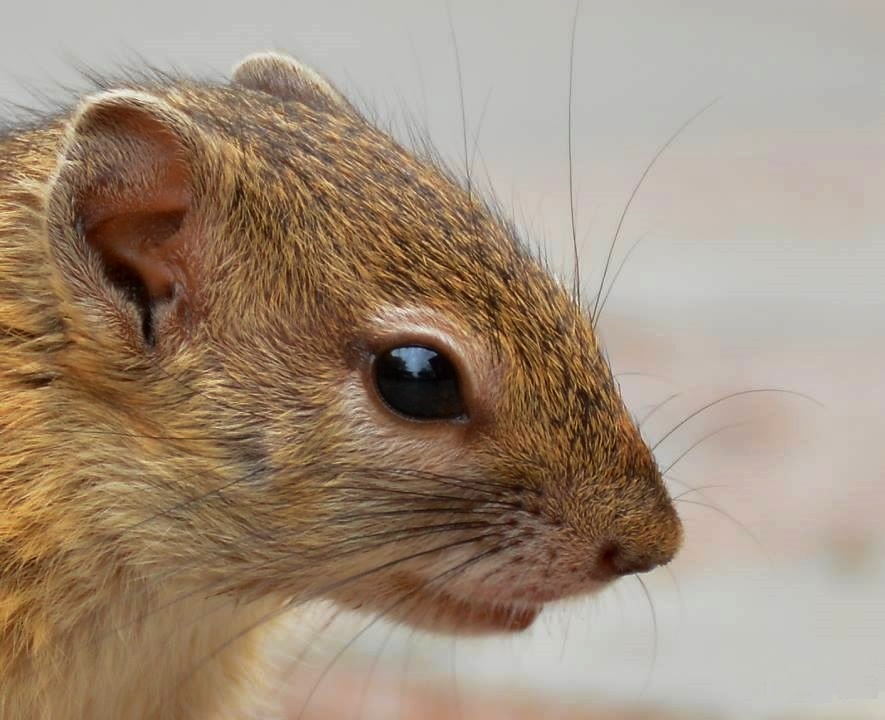

== Diet ==
Smith's bush squirrels are primarily vegetarian, but like most rodents, they take insect prey and use their front feet to manipulate food items when feeding. They scatter-hoard seeds next to tree trunks or grass tufts, thereby facilitating tree regeneration.

== Breeding ==
Essentially arboreal animals, they also spend a great deal of time on the ground, foraging for food. When disturbed, Smith's bush squirrels always seek the refuge of trees. At night, territorial family groups nest together in holes in trees. Offspring become sexually mature between six and nine months old, when they are forcibly evicted by the breeding pair. The males are mainly responsible for territorial defense, although females also chase intruders when they care for dependent pups. To promote group cohesion, a common scent is shared by mutual grooming, which is an important facet of the social fibre of this species. Smith's bush squirrels are diligent in their grooming and a mother tree squirrel holds her offspring down with her fore legs while grooming it with licks, nibbles, and scratches with her claws.

== Defense strategies ==
A conspicuous feature of their behaviour when under threat is 'mobbing': all the members of the colony make harsh clicking sounds while they flick their tails, building up momentum and gradually getting louder. In some areas, they are solitary, or are found in small family groups; a lone tree squirrel relies on its wits when in danger and always keeps a branch or the trunk of a tree between it and the enemy. Smith's bush squirrels are always alert, and when alarmed, run away with great speed, making for the nearest tree where they lie motionless, flattened against a branch.
