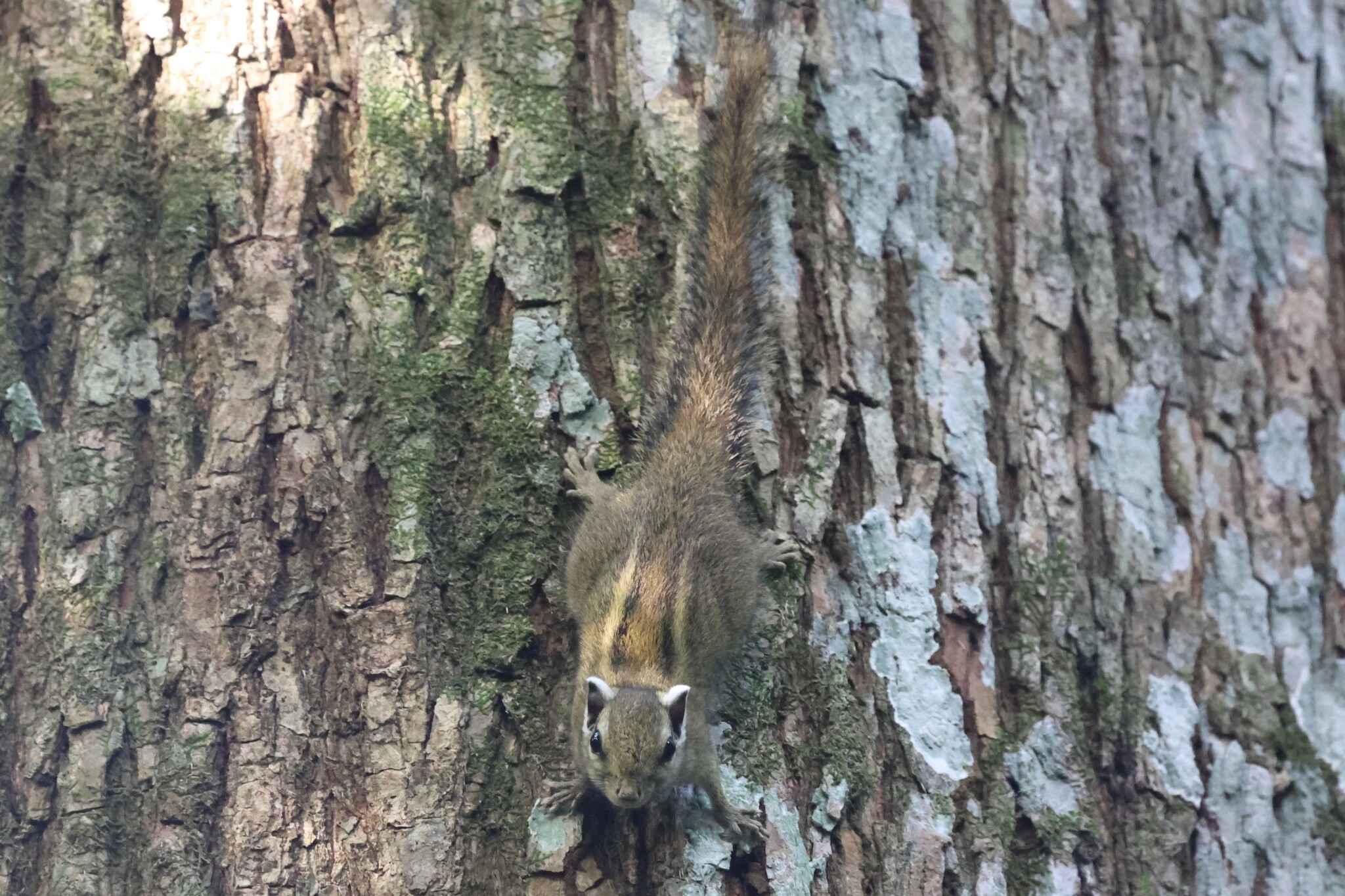

Conservation status
- Least Concern (IUCN 3.1)

Scientific classification
- Kingdom: Animalia
- Phylum: Chordata
- Class: Mammalia
- Order: Rodentia
- Family: Sciuridae
- Genus: Paraxerus
- Species: P. alexandri

Binomial name
- Paraxerus alexandri (Thomas & Wroughton, 1907)

= Alexander's bush squirrel =

Species of rodent

Alexander's bush squirrel (Paraxerus alexandri) is a species of squirrel native to the Democratic Republic of the Congo and Uganda. It is arboreal and lives in tropical moist forests, especially undisturbed mature forests. It is a common species with a wide range, and the International Union for Conservation of Nature has rated it as being of "least concern". Its common name and Latin binomial commemorate Lieutenant Boyd Alexander, a British Army officer, explorer and ornithologist.

== Description ==
This is a very small squirrel with a head-and-body length of about 100 mm (4 in) and a tail about 110 mm (4.3 in) in length, with a weight of 40 to 70 g (1.4 to 2.5 oz). The fur is a grizzled mixture of yellow, grey and black, with a few black guard hairs, giving an overall impression of a greenish-brown colour. There is a broad band of tawny orange running from the head to the rump, bordered on either side by a thin black band and a narrow creamy-white band. The underparts are a paler greenish-brown colour, sometimes with yellowish blotches. The head is a similar colour, there is a white eye-ring and the ears are fringed with white. The limbs are greenish-brown and there are four digits on the fore-feet and five digits on the hind-feet. The tail tapers towards the tip and is clad in moderate-length hairs and indistinctly barred in ochre and brown.

== Distribution and habitat ==
Alexander's bush squirrel is endemic to tropical Central Africa, where its range includes the northeast part of the Democratic Republic of the Congo and the eastern part of Uganda, from the White Nile to the Lualaba River, and from the Mbomou River in the north of Uganda to the Lukuga River in the south, a total area of occupancy of about 387,450 km^{2} (150,000 sq mi). It occurs at altitudes of between about 500 and 1,500 m (1,600 and 4,900 ft).

== Status ==
This squirrel has a wide range and is a relatively common species. It is presumed to have a large total population and occur in several protected areas. No particular threats have been identified but it may suffer from some habitat loss as forest land is cleared for agriculture. The International Union for Conservation of Nature has assessed its conservation status as being of "least concern".
