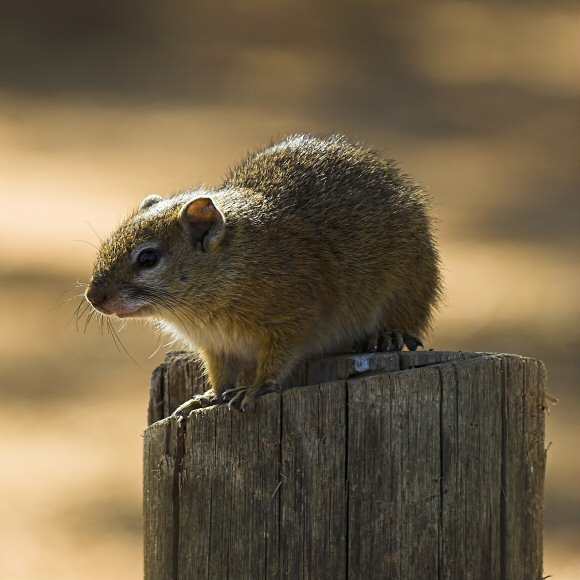
- Smith's bush squirrel (P. cepapi)

Scientific classification
- Domain: Eukaryota
- Kingdom: Animalia
- Phylum: Chordata
- Class: Mammalia
- Order: Rodentia
- Family: Sciuridae
- Subfamily: Xerinae
- Tribe: Protoxerini
- Genus: Paraxerus; Forsyth Major, 1893

Type species
- Sciurus cepapi A. Smith, 1834

Species
- See text

= African bush squirrel =

Genus of rodents

The African bush squirrels are a genus of squirrels, Paraxerus, in the subfamily Xerinae. They are only found in Africa. The 11 species in this genus are:

- Alexander's bush squirrel (P. alexandri)
- Boehm's bush squirrel (P. boehmi)
- Smith's bush squirrel (P. cepapi)
- Cooper's mountain squirrel (P. cooperi)
- Striped bush squirrel (P. flavovittis)
- Black and red bush squirrel (P. lucifer)
- Ochre bush squirrel (P. ochraceus)
- Red bush squirrel (P. palliatus)
- Green bush squirrel (P. poensis)
- Swynnerton's bush squirrel (P. vexillarius)
- Vincent's bush squirrel (P. vincenti)
