= Vincent's bush squirrel =

Conservation status
- Endangered (IUCN 3.1)

Scientific classification
- Kingdom: Animalia
- Phylum: Chordata
- Class: Mammalia
- Order: Rodentia
- Family: Sciuridae
- Genus: Paraxerus
- Species: P. vincenti

Binomial name
- Paraxerus vincenti Hayman, 1950

Species of rodent

Vincent's bush squirrel (Paraxerus vincenti) is a species of rodent in the family Sciuridae, named in honour of Jack Vincent. It is endemic to Mozambique. Its natural habitat is subtropical or tropical moist montane forests, and it is threatened by habitat loss.
