= Tukuyu =

Town in Rugwe District, Mbeya Region, Tanzania

- Town
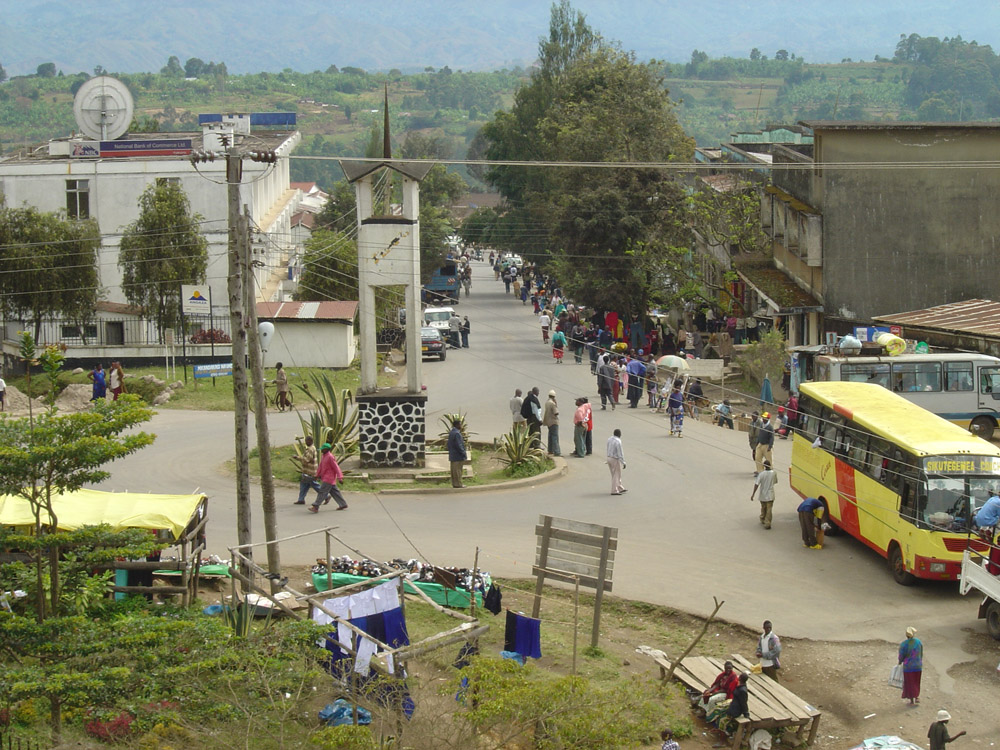
- Tukuyu

- Location of Tukuyu Tukuyu (Africa) Tukuyu (Earth)
- Coordinates: 9°15′S 33°39′E
- Country: Tanzania
- Region: Mbeya
- District: Rungwe

Population (2022 census)
  - Total: 50,000
- Time zone: UTC+3 (EAT)
- Area code: 25
- Website: Regional website

Tukuyu, formerly known as Neu Langenburg during the German's colonial rule, is a hillside town that lies about 36 miles (58 km) south of the city of Mbeya, at an elevation of around 5,000 ft (1,500 m) in the highland Rungwe District of southern Tanzania, East Africa. Tukuyu has a moderate to cool temperature ranging from 10 °C in May and June to mid 20 °C in around November. The town and the surrounding areas are green all year round due to the almost year-round convectional rains resulting from Lake Nyasa. Tukuyu is divided into several wards include; Kawetere, Msasani, Bulyaga and Bagamoyo.

The local language is Nyakyusa, together with the national language Swahili. Secondary and college education is done in the English language. The people are the Nyakyusa, although localised groups give themselves different local names, such as the Waandali from the surrounding Ileje mountains. There are also intermarriages with the Kinga, Wabena and Kisii tribes from the Livingstone mountain ranges.

The Nyakyusa tribe which dominates the whole of Rungwe and Kyela Districts, these districts can also be found in the Northern Part of Malawi.

== History ==
In 1891, Lutheran and Moravian Christian missionaries started to work in this region, aiming to convert the local population to their faith.

German administration at the north end of Lake Nyasa was established in January 1893, some eighteen months after the arrival of the first German missionaries. The new administration arrived in the form of a party led by Hermann von Wissman, Imperial Commissioner and Commander-in-Chief, with orders to take possession of the territory in the south of German East Africa secured under the terms of the Anglo-German Agreement of 1890.

The town was founded in 1900 by the German Imperial regime as the colonial town of Neu Langenburg, named after the original Langenburg on the shores of Lake Nyassa which had to be given up due to rising sea levels. It was an important regional centre under the Germans and consequently there is an important Lutheran presence here, including a hospital. According to the 1920 Deutsches Koloniallexikon two of the ten shops were operated by Europeans (the rest of the shops were operated by Indian Khojas) and the police force, composed of "coloureds", was 66 men strong.

The town was administered by the British from 1919 until 1961, as Tukuyu in the British Empire's Tanganyika Territory. After 1919, when the Germans left, Scottish missionaries carried on the work of their German Catholic counterparts at the Kiymbila and Itete Stations. The British established a large hospital in the town in the early 1920s, and built roads and bridges. There was a small British military post some miles south at Masoko.

== Topography ==
The dormant volcano of Mount Rungwe, rising to 2,961 metres (9,715 feet) above sea level rises above the town, a part of the Great Rift Valley. Much of the mountain's area contains forest reserve, established as reserve by the British in 1949. Rungwe has unbroken 10−15 m closed-canopy forest up to the treeline at 2600 m, and is home to numerous important bird species. The bamboo zone starts at 1,900 metres (6,200 feet), and bamboo wood is extensively used by local people. The mountain forest has spiritual significance for the Wanyakyusa people (locally called 'Isyeto'). A lava flow from Mount Rungwe formed a natural bridge called Daraja la Mungu or the "Bridge of God" on the Kiwira River, which is fast-flowing and borders the Ileje mountain ranges. Other notable topographic features are the Masoko Crater and the Kaporogwe Falls. Rungwe's ridge falls north-west to merge into the Poroto Mountains.

In and around Tukuyu there are some notable but very slight tremors due to the volcanic nature of the region. About 30 km away at Kyejo, carbon dioxide oozes out from the earth, proving the region has not-so-dormant volcanic activity.

The area can produce spectacular short-lived thunderstorms. The yearly temperature for the entire Rungwe district ranges from a maximum of 27 °C during November and December to a minimum of about 5 °C during June and July. But one has to be cautious, because even in the hottest season the temperature difference between day and night is around 10 °C. The wettest period for Tukuyu is in the period of November to April, where rain, sometimes in sleet, may rain for days on end. June to September, however, is relatively dry and sunny.

To the east of the town is the Kipengere Range of mountains, better known as the Livingstone Range, beyond which the land becomes incredibly harsh and mountainous.

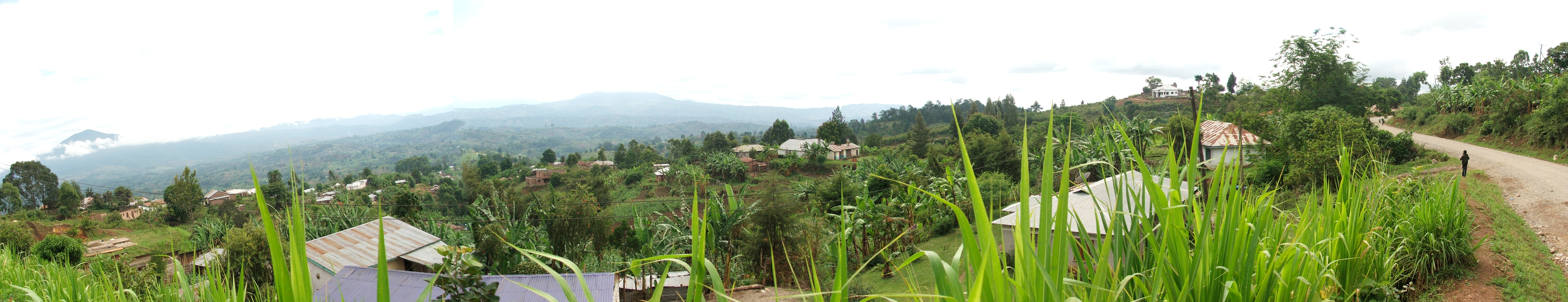
Panorama taken in Tukuyu.

== Infrastructure ==
The National Institute for Medical Research has a significant Medical Research Station there, and there is a small Lutheran hospital. The Africa Bridge charity is based near Tukuyu. There is a school, the Kipande School, and several other small educational initiatives. The town is the headquarters of the Konde Diocese of the influential Lutheran Church in Tanzania.

However the Moravian Church, which originated from Germany and Central Europe has a very large following in and around Tukuyu and Rungwe District and also the entire Southern Highlands.

Rungwe mission (about 10 km from the Mbeya−Tukuyu road) is a centre established as the alternative missionary settlement for the Moravian Church. This centre comprises a secondary school, an original Moravian Church and other agricultural training schemes.

There is a small Post Office at Tukuyu. The area has many commercial tea plantations, some coffee, and there is intensive smallholder agricultural use of the well-watered rich volcanic soils.

== Tourism ==
The surrounding Southern Highlands of Tanzania make for excellent hiking and walking.

The forests contain freshwater rivers and streams and are located in a highland area with a relatively cool climate. The area is inhabited by local communities and has few species considered dangerous to visitors. Ngozi Peak overlooks Lake Ngozi, a volcanic crater lake associated with a local water-serpent legend. Overnight camping is possible in the area.

The town sees around 2500 mm of rain per year, with no month receiving less than 50 millimetres (2 inches) of rain. Rainfall and mists are common in some seasons and the nights are often cool; very-lightweight waterproofs, and a light sweater and cap are advisable in some months. (For details of the rain season months, see Mbeya).

== Cash crops ==
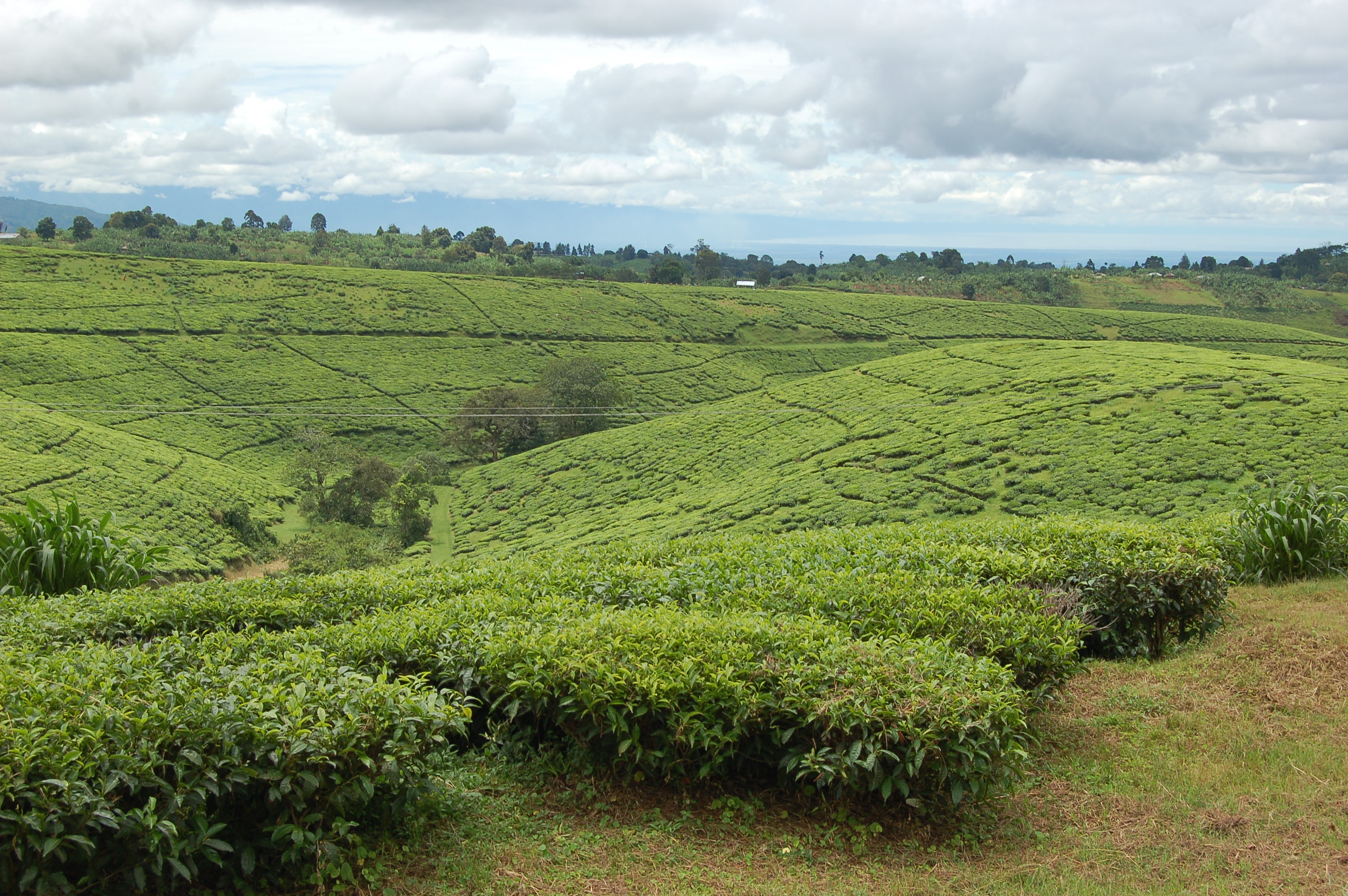
Tea fields at Kyimbila near Tukuyu town.

Tea is widely cultivated around Tukuyu. It is one of the perennial crops that many small scale farmers depend on. There is a tea processing factory at Katumba, (Wakulima Tea Company) 5 km from Tukuyu, as one travels to Mbeya.

Coffee is also grown extensively around Tukuyu though in recent years the yield has been dropping due to falling financial returns to the farmers.
