= Kiwira River =

River in Mbeya Region, Tanzania

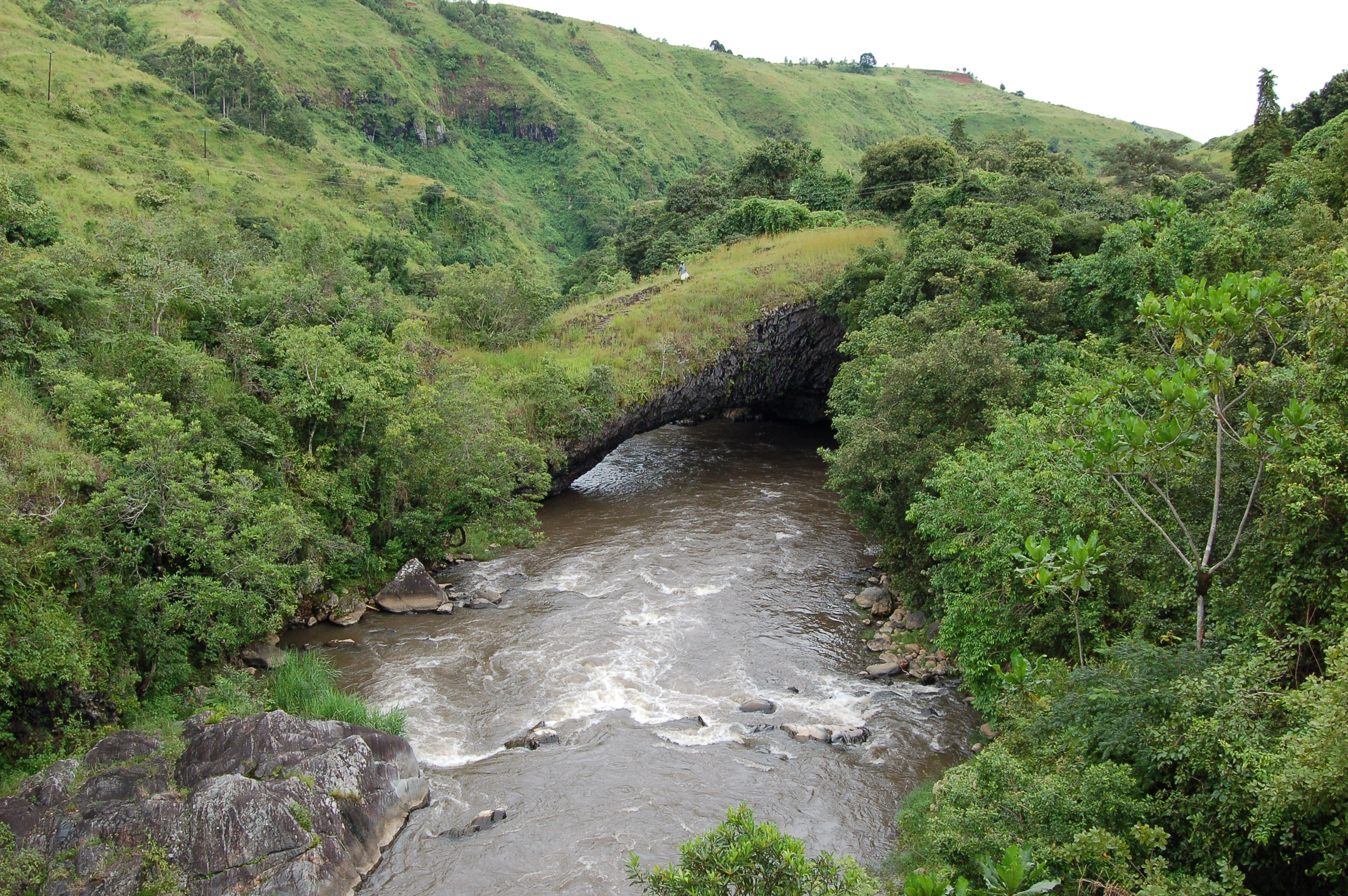
- Daraja la Mungu, a natural bridge spanning Kiwira River west of Tukuyu

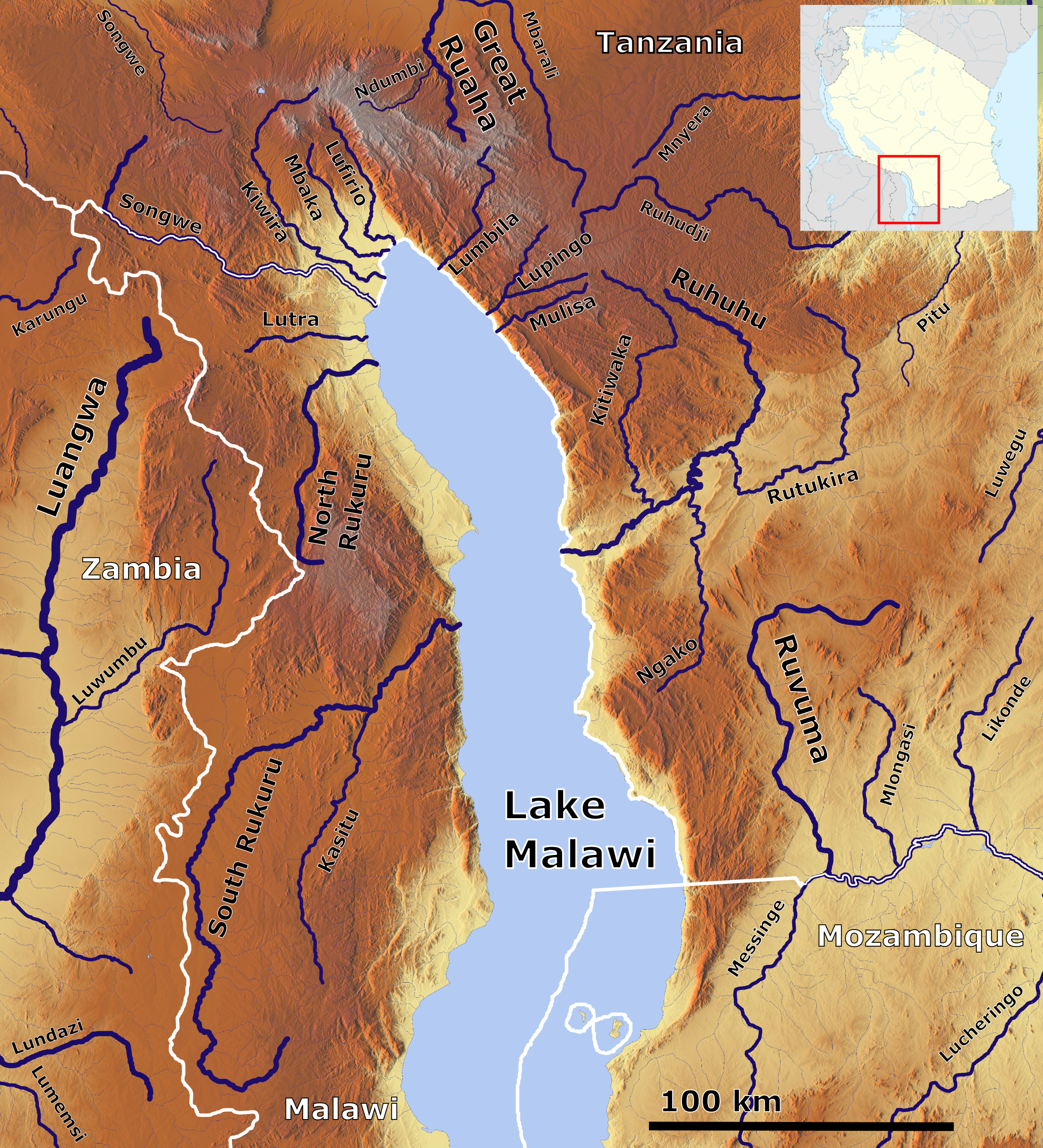
- Kiwira river (top left center)
- Native name: Mto Kiwira (Swahili)

Location
- Country: Tanzania
- Region: Mbeya
- District: Kyela District
- District: Rungwe District

Physical characteristics
- Source: Mount Rungwe, Poroto Mountains
- 2nd source: Marogala Stream
- 3rd source: Sinini Stream
- 4th source: Kipoke Stream
- 5th source: Kilasi Stream
- Mouth: Lake Malawi

Kiwira River is a river located in Rungwe District and Kyela District of Mbeya Region, Tanzania.

== Course ==
The river rises in the Poroto Mountains southeast of Mbeya and receives several streams originating on the slopes of Mount Rungwe, including the Marogala, Sinini, Kipoke, Kilasi and Mulagala. Kijungu Falls is on the upper course of the river. It then flows southeast and empties into the northern end of Lake Malawi near the town of Kyela. The lower course flows through the Kyela Plain, which sits northwest of Lake Malawi in the valley of the East African Rift. The Kyela Plain is cultivated intensively with rice and other crops.

== Daraja la Mungu ==
Daraja la Mungu (Swahili: "Bridge of God") is a natural bridge that spans the Kiwira River at 9.27703°S 33.55185°E, reputedly formed less than a thousand years ago by a lava flow from Mount Rungwe. It can be viewed from a man-made bridge crossing the river 500 m upstream.
