= Revúboé River =

- The Revuboe basin

Location
- Country: Mozambique

Physical characteristics
- Source
  - location: Mozambique highlands
- Mouth: Zambezi River
  - coordinates: 16°10′44″S 33°37′07″E
- Length: 187.95 mi (302.48 km)

The Revúboé River is a river in Mozambique. The river is a large perennial tributary of the Zambezi river.

== Description ==
Originating in the highlands along Mozambique's northern border with Malawi, the Revúboé flows south for several hundred kilometers through the rugged countryside. On its way south, the river is fed by a number of smaller rivers, most notably the Ponfi and Condedezi rivers. The Revuboe mouths at the left bank of the Zambezi River near the city of Tete.

=== Economic activity ===
The Revúboé flows near some of Mozambique's largest reserves of coal and coke; as such, several large mining projects draw water from the river for use in mining operations.

Several hydroelectric power plants are located along the river. The Revuboe has been considered as a site for more hydroelectric plants.

The river's delivery of water and nutrients from the north of the country stimulates agriculture along its course. The lands near the mouth of the river were traditionally fertile farmlands, but government-sponsored relocation of farmers (done to clear land for mining projects) in the 2010s resulted in a decline in agricultural activity.
