= Misuku Hills =

Hills in Chitipa district, Malawi

Coordinates: 9°40′S 33°33′E

The Misuku Hills are a mountain range in Malawi's Northern Region.

== Geography ==
The Misuku Hills lie near Malawi's northern border. They are bounded on the north by the Songwe River, which forms Malawi's northern border with Tanzania. Tanzania's Umalila Mountains lie north of the Songwe.

On the east and south, the Misuku hills transition to a hilly plateau that slopes towards Lake Malawi. The valley of the Kaseye River, a northward-flowing tributary of the Songwe, bounds the hills on the west. The Chitipa Plain lies to the southwest.

The tallest peaks are Matipa (2124 m) and Mughese (1909 m).

== Ecology ==
The natural vegetation in the hills is mostly miombo woodland. The hills are fertile and well-watered and support a rural population, and much of the woodland has been converted to farms and gardens.

Two enclaves of montane evergreen forest live on the hills' highest ridges. They occupy two parallel ridges which run northwest-southeast, separated by several kilometers of cultivated land. The forests in the Matipa-Wilindi ridge occupy 2,400 ha, ranging from 1,700–2,050 meters elevation. The Mughese forests occupy about 720 ha, ranging from 1,600–1,880 meters elevation. The forests yield to pockets of montane grassland along the ridgeline.

The Afromontane rainforests of the Misuku hills are some of the most diverse and species-rich in Malawi, with 150 species of trees recorded. Their closeness to southwestern Tanzania's concentration of montane forests and grasslands, and the hills' favorable climate soils, help account for the diversity. Aningeria adolfi-friederici and Entandrophragma excelsum are predominant emergent trees. Strangler figs (Ficus spp.) are abundant. The montane forest trees Cylicomorpha parviflora and Mitragyna rubrostipulata reach the southern range of their distribution in the Misuku Hills.

The montane forests support populations of Moloney's White-collared Monkey (Cercopithecus mitis moloneyi). The only occurrence in Malawi of the Silvered bat (Glauconycteris argentata), Lord Derby's scaly-tailed squirrel (Anomalurus derbianus), and the Tanzanian vlei rat (Otomys lacustris) is in the Misuku Hills. The Black and red bush squirrel (Paraxerus lucifer) is found in the Misuku Hills, along with the Nyika Plateau to the south, and Mount Rungwe and Poroto Mountains to the north in Tanzania.

== Forest reserves ==
The Matipa (10.62 km^{2}), Mughese (6.73 km^{2}), and Wilindi (9.07 km^{2}) forest reserves were established in 1948 to protect the hills' largest enclaves of montane rainforest, along with areas of montane grassland and miombo woodland.
