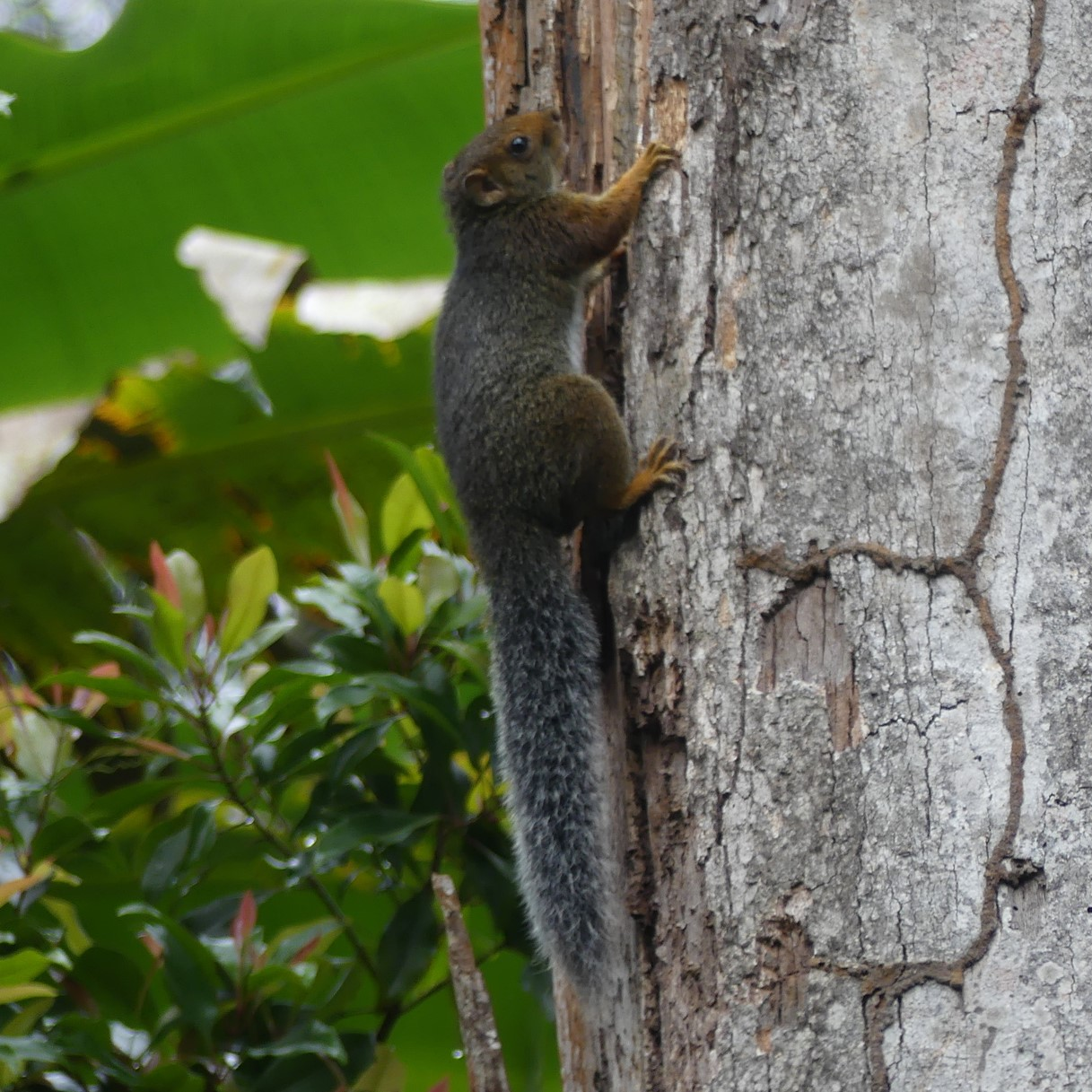

Conservation status
- Least Concern (IUCN 3.1)

Scientific classification
- Kingdom: Animalia
- Phylum: Chordata
- Class: Mammalia
- Order: Rodentia
- Family: Sciuridae
- Genus: Paraxerus
- Species: P. vexillarius

Binomial name
- Paraxerus vexillarius (Kershaw, 1923)

Subspecies
- P. v. vexillarius; P. v. byatti

= Swynnerton's bush squirrel =

Species of rodent

Swynnerton's bush squirrel (Paraxerus vexillarius), also known as Svynnerton's bush squirrel, is a species of rodent in the family Sciuridae endemic to Tanzania. Its natural habitat is subtropical or tropical moist montane forests.
