= Songwe River =

River that divides Malawi and Tanzania

Coordinates: 9.7186°S 33.9383°E

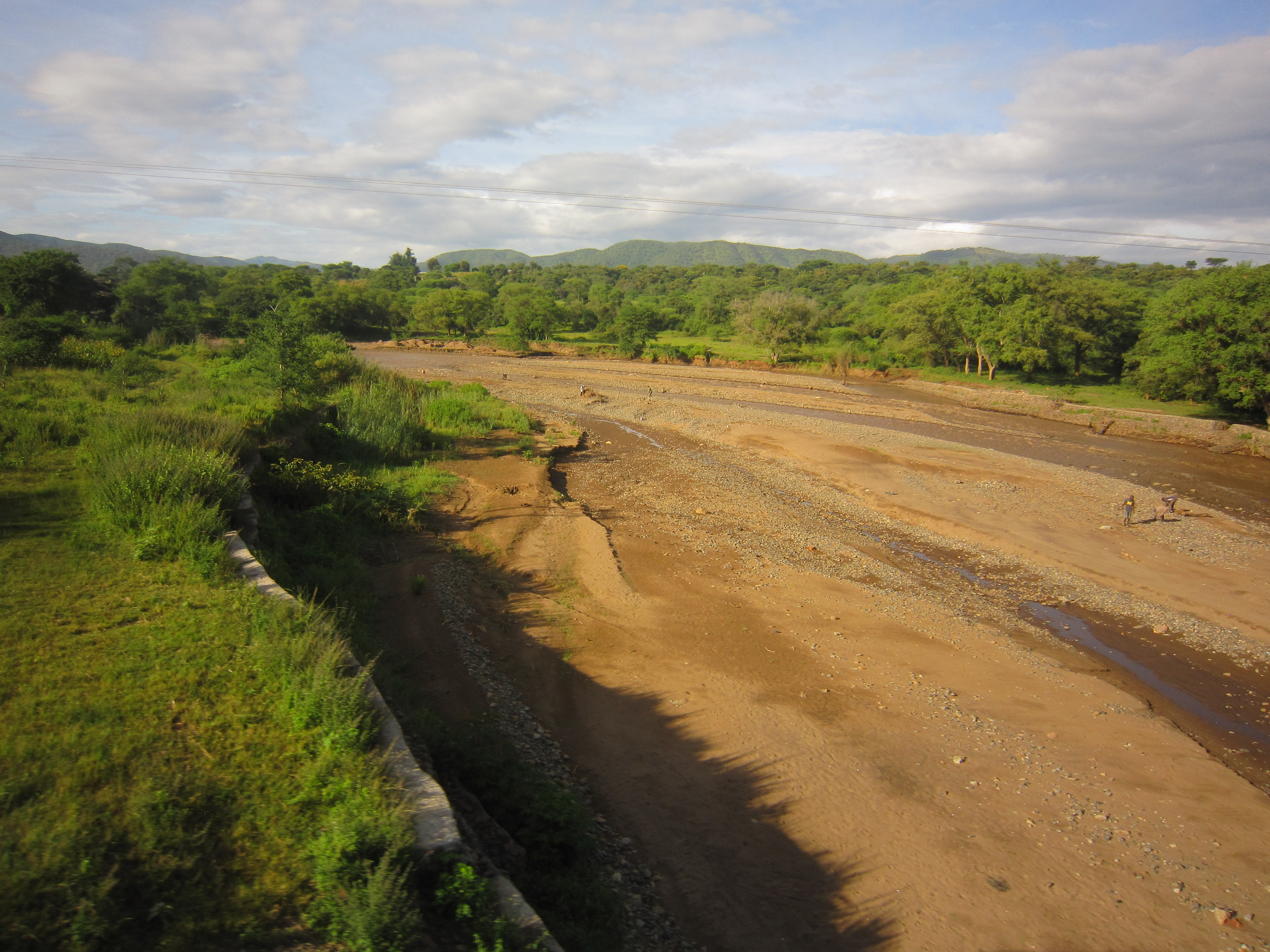

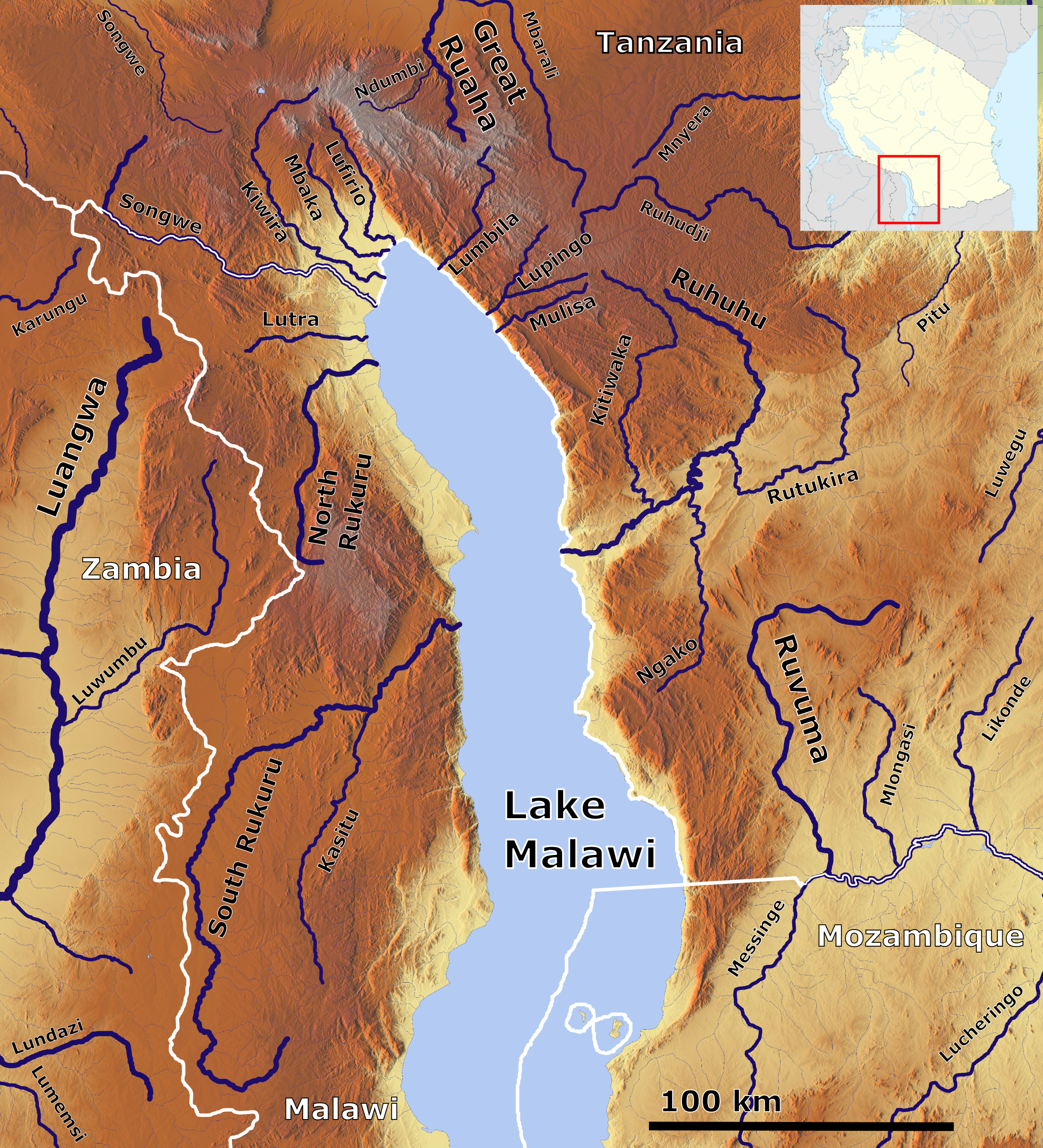
- Songwe River (top left)
- Native name: Mto Songwe (Swahili)

Location
- Country: Malawi
- Country: Tanzania
- Region: Songwe Region
- Country: Zambia

Physical characteristics
- Mouth
  - location: Lake Nyasa

The Songwe River is a river that forms the international boundary between Malawi and Songwe Region, Tanzania. The songwe region in Tanzania is named after the river.

The Songwe's headwaters are where the borders of Malawi, Tanzania, and Zambia meet. It flows southeast to empty into Lake Nyasa. The middle course separates Malawi's Misuku Hills from the Umalila Mountains in Songwe Region Tanzania. The lower course flows through the Kyela Plain, a fertile lowland lying northwest of Lake Malawi the valley of the East African Rift. The Kyela Plain is cultivated intensively with rice and other crops.
